This list of Cornell University alumni includes notable graduates, non-graduate former students, and current students of Cornell University. Cornell counted 245,027 living alumni as of August 2008. Its alumni includes 25 recipients of National Medal of Science and National Medal of Technology and Innovation combined, 36 MacArthur Fellows, 34 Marshall Scholars and 31 Rhodes Scholars, 242 elected members of the National Academy of Sciences, 201 elected members of the National Academy of Engineering, 190 plus heads of higher learning institutions in the United States and around the world, and Cornell is the only university in the world with three female winners of unshared Nobel Prizes among its graduates (Pearl S. Buck, Barbara McClintock, and Toni Morrison). Many alumni maintain university ties through Homecoming's reunion weekend, through Cornell Magazine, and through the Cornell Club of New York. In 2005, Cornell ranked No. 3 nationwide for gifts and bequests from alumni. Alumni are known as Cornellians, many of whom are noted for their accomplishments in public, professional, and corporate life.

Fictional alumni have been portrayed in several films, television shows, and books. Characters include Andy Bernard of The Office, Natalie Keener of Up in the Air, Tom Kirkman of Designated Survivor, Christina Pagniacci of Any Given Sunday, and Shane Patton of HBO's The White Lotus.

Nobel laureates

Chemistry
 Eric Betzig (M.S. 1985; PhD 1988, applied and engineering physics) – Chemistry, 2014; member of the National Academy of Sciences (2015)
 Joachim Frank (postdoctoral fellow 1972) – Chemistry, 2017; member of the National Academy of Sciences (2006)
 William Moerner (PhD 1982, experimental physics) – Chemistry, 2014; Wolf Prize in Chemistry (2008); member of the National Academy of Sciences (2007)

Physics
 Arthur Ashkin (PhD 1952 nuclear physics) – Physics 2018; pioneer in Optical tweezers; member of the National Academy of Engineering (1984) and the National Academy of Sciences (1996); recipient of the Harvey Prize (2004)
 Sheldon Glashow (B.A. 1954 physics) – Physics 1979; Physics (1979); member of the National Academy of Sciences since 1977
 Russell Hulse — Physics 1993; conducted award-winning research at Cornell's affiliated Arecibo Observatory (1974)) 
 John M. Kosterlitz — Physics 2016; postdoctoral fellow (1973–1974); fellow of the American Physical Society; recipient of the Maxwell Medal and Prize (1981) and the Lars Onsager Prize (2000); member of the National Academy of Sciences, since 2017
 Douglas D. Osheroff (M.S. 1971 physics, PhD 1973 physics) –  Physics 1996; MacArthur Fellow (1981); member of the National Academy of Sciences, since 1987
 Isidor Isaac Rabi (B.Chem. 1919; graduate study 1921–23, transferred) – Physics 1944; member of the National Academy of Sciences, since 1940
 David J. Thouless (PhD 1958) – Physics 2016; fellow of the Royal Society, of the American Physical Society and of the American Academy of Arts and Sciences; member of the National Academy of Sciences (1995); recipient of the Maxwell Medal and Prize (1973), the Wolf Prize in Physics (1990), the Paul Dirac Medal (1993), and the Lars Onsager Prize (2000)
 Steven Weinberg (B.A. 1954 physics) – Physics 1979, National Medal of Science (1991); member of the National Academy of Sciences (1972)

Peace, literature, or economics
 Pearl S. Buck (M.A. 1925 English literature) – Literature 1938
 Robert F. Engle (M.S. 1966 physics, PhD 1969 economics) – Economics 2003; member of the National Academy of Sciences (2005)
 Robert Fogel (B.A. 1948 history, minor in economics) – Economics 1993; member of the National Academy of Sciences (1973)
 Toni Morrison (M.A. 1955 English) – A.D. White Professor-at-Large, 1997–2003) – Literature 1993; National Humanities Medal (2000), Pulitzer Prize for Fiction (1988)
 John Mott (B.S. 1888 philosophy) – Peace 1946

Physiology or medicine
 George Wells Beadle (PhD 1930 genetics) – Physiology or Medicine 1958; member of the National Academy of Sciences (1944), Albert Lasker Award for Basic Medical Research (1950)
 Robert W. Holley (PhD 1947 organic chemistry; professor and department chair in biochemistry, 1948–68) – Physiology or Medicine 1968; member of the National Academy of Sciences (1968), Albert Lasker Award for Basic Medical Research (1965)
 Barbara McClintock (B.S. 1923 botany, M.A. 1925 botany, PhD 1927 cytology; instructor in Botany, 1927–31; A.D. White Professor-at-Large, 1965–74) – Physiology or Medicine 1983; National Medal of Science (1970); MacArthur Fellow (1981); Wolf Prize in Medicine (1981); member of the National Academy of Sciences (1944), Albert Lasker Award for Basic Medical Research (1981)
 Hermann Joseph Muller (graduate study 1911–12) – Physiology or Medicine 1946; member of the National Academy of Sciences (1931)
 Jack W. Szostak (PhD 1977 biochemistry) – Physiology or Medicine 2009; member of the National Academy of Sciences (1998), Albert Lasker Award for Basic Medical Research (2006)

Government

Heads of state

 Jamshid Amouzegar (B.S. 1945 engineering, PhD 1951) – Prime Minister of Iran, 1977–78
 Václav Klaus (1969, no degree) – President of the Czech Republic (2003–2013), Prime Minister of the Czech Republic (1992–1997)
 Mario García Menocal (B.S. 1888 engineering) – President of Cuba, 1913–21
 Lee Teng-hui (PhD 1968 agricultural economics) – President of the Republic of China (Taiwan), 1988–2000
 Tsai Ing-wen (LL.M. 1980) – President of the Republic of China (Taiwan) (2016 to date), chairperson of the Democratic Progressive Party in Taiwan and former Vice Premier (January 25, 2006 – May 21, 2007) (her LL.M.1980)

U.S. Supreme Court justices

 Ruth Bader Ginsburg (B.A. 1954 government) – U.S. Supreme Court associate justice 1993–2020

U.S. Cabinet and cabinet-level ranks

 Sandy Berger (B.A. 1967 government) – National Security Advisor to President Bill Clinton, 1997–2001
 Samuel Bodman (B.S. 1961 chemical engineering) – Deputy Secretary of Commerce, 2001–2003, Deputy Secretary of the Treasury (2004–2005), Secretary of Energy, 2005–2009; member of the National Academy of Engineering (2006)
 Jim Bridenstine (M.B.A) – Administrator of NASA (2013-2018)
 Lincoln D. Faurer (attended, did not graduate) – director, National Security Agency 1981–85
 W. Scott Gould (A.B.) – United States Deputy Secretary of Veterans Affairs (April 9, 2009 – May 17, 2013)
 Stephen Hadley (B.A. 1969 government) – National Security Advisor to President George W. Bush, 2005–2009
 Seth Harris (B.S. ILR 1983) – Deputy Secretary of Labor (2009–2014) and Acting Secretary of Labor (January 22, 2013 – July 23, 2013)
 Eugene Kinckle Jones (M.A. 1908 social science) – member of Franklin D. Roosevelt's Black Cabinet, executive secretary of the National Urban League; founder of Alpha Phi Alpha Fraternity
 C. Everett Koop (M.D. 1941) – Surgeon General of the United States under president Ronald Reagan, 1982–89; recipient of the Tyler Prize for Environmental Achievement (1991)
 Henry Morgenthau Jr. (undergrad 1909–10, 1912–13, dropped out) – Secretary of the Treasury, 1934–45
 Edmund Muskie (LL.B. 1939) – Governor of Maine, 1955–59; Senator from Maine, 1959–80; vice presidential candidate, 1968; Secretary of State, 1980–81
 James Peake (M.D. 1972) – former Surgeon General of the United States Army, 2000–2004; United States Secretary of Veterans Affairs, 2007–2009
 Samuel Pierce (B.A. 1947, J.D. 1949; trustee, 1972–77, 1978–82) – Secretary of Housing and Urban Development under Ronald Reagan, 1981–89
 Thomas C. Reed (B.S. 1956 mechanical engineering) – Secretary of the Air Force under Gerald Ford and Jimmy Carter, 1976–77
 Janet Reno (B.A. 1960 chemistry; professor) – Attorney General under Bill Clinton, 1993–2001
 William P. Rogers (LL.B. 1937) – Attorney General, 1957–61, Secretary of State (1969–73), Presidential Medal of Freedom recipient, 1973
 Louis Wade Sullivan (Medical College Resident) – Secretary of Health and Human Services under George H. W. Bush, 1989–93; founder, dean and president of Morehouse School of Medicine 
 Nancy Sutley (B.A.) – Chair of the Council on Environmental Quality under Barack Obama (2009–2014)
 Daniel I. Werfel (B.S. 1993, Industrial and Labor Relations) - Acting Commissioner of the Internal Revenue Service under Barack Obama (2013); Commissioner of the Internal Revenue Service under Joe Biden, Current
 John P. White (B.S. 1959 ILR) – United States Deputy Secretary of Defense (1995–1997)
 Paul Wolfowitz (B.A. 1965 mathematics and chemistry) – Deputy Secretary of Defense under George W. Bush, 2001–05, president of the World Bank, 2005–2007

U.S. governors

 John Alden Dix (attended 1879–1882) – 38th Governor of New York, 1911–1912
 Joseph B. Foraker (B.A. 1869) – Governor of Ohio (1886–90); Senator of Ohio (1897–1909); one of eight members of Cornell's first graduating class
 James Benton Grant (attended 1873–1874) – Governor of Colorado, 1883–1885
 Herbert James Hagerman (1890) – 17th Governor of the New Mexico Territory (1906–1907)
 Philip H. Hoff (J.D. 1951) – Governor of Vermont (1963–69); first Democrat to serve in that position since the Civil War
 Goodwin Knight (graduate study 1919–20) – Governor of California, 1953–1959
 John T. Morrison (LL.B. degree 1890) – sixth Governor of Idaho, 1903–1905
 Edmund Muskie (LL.B. 1939) – Governor of Maine, 1955–59; Senator from Maine, 1959–80; vice presidential candidate, 1968; Secretary of State, 1980–81
 Chuck Robb (undergrad 1957–58, transferred) – Senator from Virginia, 1989–2001; Governor of Virginia, 1982–1986
 Horace White (1887) – member of New York State Senate, 1896–1908; Lieutenant Governor of New York, 1909–1910; 37th Governor of New York

U.S. senators
 Joseph B. Foraker (B.A. 1869) – Governor of Ohio (1886–90); Senator of Ohio (1897–1909); one of eight members of Cornell's first graduating class
 Thomas C. Hennings, Jr. (1924) – Representative, Missouri 11th District (1935–40); Senator of Missouri (1951–60)
 Mark Kirk (B.A. 1981 history) – Illinois 10th District, 2001–2011; senator, 2011–2017
 Edmund Muskie (LL.B. 1939) – Governor of Maine, 1955–59; Senator from Maine, 1959–80; vice presidential candidate, 1968; Secretary of State, 1980–81
 Chuck Robb (undergrad 1957–58, transferred) – senator, Virginia, 1989–2001

U.S. representatives

 John G. Alexander (J.D. 1916) – Minnesota 3rd District, 1939–41
 Rob Andrews (J.D. 1982) – New Jersey 1st District, 1990–2014
 Andrew Biemiller (B.A. 1926) – Wisconsin, 1945–47, 1949–51
 Jim Bridenstine (M.B.A) – Oklahoma 1st District, 2013–2018; Administrator of NASA (2018–)
 Frederick Van Ness Bradley (1921) – Michigan, 1939–47
 Abraham Lincoln Brick (undergrad) – Indiana, 1899–1908
 Katherine Clark (J.D.) – Massachusetts 5th, 2013–present 
 Hansen Clarke (B.F.A.) – Michigan 13th District, 2010–2013
 Barber Conable (B.A. 1942 medieval history, LL.B. 1948) – New York 37th District, 1965–73; 35th District, 1973–83; 30th District, 1983–85; president of the World Bank, 1986–91
 Maurice Connolly (1897) – Iowa, 1913–15
 Sharice Davids (J.D. 2010) – Kansas 3rd district, 2019–
 Thomas Joseph Downey (B.S. 1970) – New York 2nd District, 1975–93
 Bob Filner (B.A. 1963 chemistry, PhD 1973 history of science) – California 50th District, 1993–2003, 51st District, 2003–2012; San Diego mayor, 2012–present
 Chris Gibson (MPA 1995, M.A. 1996, PhD 1998) – New York 20th District (2011–2013), 19th District (2013–)
 Gabby Giffords (M.R.P. 1996) – Arizona, 8th District, 2007–2012
 Norman Judd Gould (M.E. 1899) – New York, 1915–23
 Gilbert Gude (B.S. 1948) – Maryland 8th District, 1967–77
 Edwin Arthur Hall – New York, 1939–53
 Nan Hayworth (M.D. 1985) – New York 19th district, 2011–2013
 Joseph Clifford Hendrix (studies 1870–73; trustee) – New York, 1893–95
 Lewis Henry (1909) – New York, 1922–23
 Frank Horton (L.L.B. 1947) – New York 36th District (1963–73), 34th District (1973–83), 29th District, 1983–93
 Charles Samuel Joelson (B.A. 1937, L.L.B. 1939) – New Jersey, 1961–69
 Clarence Evans Kilburn (1916) – New York, 1940–65
 Mark Kirk (B.A. 1981 history) – Illinois 10th District, 2001–2011; Senator, 2011–2017
 Gary Alcide Lee (graduate study 1963) – New York, 1979–83
 Norman F. Lent (L.L.B. 1957) – New York 5th District (1971–73), 4th District, 1973–93
 Richard Dean McCarthy (graduate study) – New York, 1965–71
 Dan Meuser (B.A. 1988) –  Pennsylvania 9th, 2019–present
 Clement Woodnutt Miller (1946 industrial & labor relations) – California, 1959–62
 Robert J. Mrazek (B.A. 1967 government) – New York 3rd District, 1983–93
 James R. Olin (B.E.E. 1943) – Virginia, 1983–93
 Richard Ottinger (B.A. 1950) – New York (1965–71, 1975–85); founder and second staff member of the Peace Corps (1961–64); dean of Pace Law School, 1994–99
 James Parker (1887) – New York 29th District, 1913–33
 Edward Worthington Pattison (B.A. 1953, L.L.B. 1957) – New York, 1975–79
 John Raymond Pillion (L.L.B. 1927) – New York, 1953–65
 Alexander Pirnie (1924, J.D. 1926) – New York 34th District (1959–63), 32nd District, 1963–73
 Daniel A. Reed (1898) – New York 43rd District (1919–45, 1953–59), 45th District, 1945–53
 Henry Schoellkopf Reuss (B.A. 1933) – Wisconsin, 1955–83
 Howard Winfield Robison (1937, law 1939) – New York, 1958–75
 James A. Roe (School of Military Aeronautics 1917) – New York, 1945–47
 Kurt Schrader (B.A. 1973) – Oregon 5th District, 2009–present
 George Shiras III (1881) – Pennsylvania, 1903–05
 Henry P. Smith III (Law 1936) – New York, 1965–75
 Elissa Slotkin (B.A. 1989) – Michigan 8th, 2019–
 James H. Southard (law 1874) – Ohio, 1895–1907
 Sam Steiger (attended two years) – Arizona, 1946–47
 Elmer E. Studley (1894) – New York, 1933–35
 Frank Sundstrom (1924) – New Jersey 11th District, 1943–49
 Paul Harold Todd, Jr. (B.S. 1942) – Michigan (1965–67), CEO of Planned Parenthood, 1967–70
 William Edgar Tuttle, Jr. (undergrad 1887–89) – New Jersey, 1911–15
 Beth Van Duyne (1995) - Texas 24th, 2021-
 George Ernest Waldo (undergrad 1868–70) – New York, 1905–09
 John De Witt Warner (1872) – New York, 1891–95
 John S. Wold (M.S. 1939) – Wyoming, 1969–71

Diplomats

 Parker W. Borg (MPA 1965) – United States Ambassador to Mali (1981–1984) and United States Ambassador to Iceland (1993–1996)
 William Brownfield (1974) – U.S. Ambassador to Chile (2002–2004), Venezuela (2004–2007), and Colombia (2007–2010)
 Richard Burt (B.A. 1969) – United States Ambassador to Germany (1985–1989); chief negotiator of the Strategic Arms Reduction Treaty (rank of Ambassador); Assistant Secretary of State for European and Canadian Affairs (1983–1985)
 Dwight L. Bush, Sr. (B.A. 1979) – businessman; United States Ambassador to Morocco (2014– )
 Henry A. Byroade (M.S. 1940 civil engineering) – career diplomat serving as U.S. Ambassador to Egypt (1955–1956), South Africa (1956–1959), Afghanistan (1959–1962), Burma (1963–1968), Philippines (1969–1973), Pakistan (1973–1977)
 Timothy M. Carney (1975–1976 Southeast Asian studies) – United States Ambassador to Sudan (1995–1997), United States Ambassador to Haiti (1998–1999)
 Chan Heng Chee (M.A. 1967 government) – Singapore's Ambassador to the U.S. (1996–2012) and to Mexico (1989–1991)
 Arthur Hobson Dean (B.A. 1921, L.L.B. 1923) – international law expert, chief U.S. negotiator at Panmunjeom, assisted with negotiations for Nuclear Test Ban Treaty, delegate to the United Nations
 Eric S. Edelman (B.A. 1972 history) – United States Ambassador to Finland (1998–2001), United States Ambassador to Turkey (2003–2005)
 Glenn W. Ferguson (B.A. 1950 economics, MBA 1951) – United States Ambassador to Kenya, 1966–1969, academic administrator
 Robert Ford (M.A. 1940 history) – Canadian Ambassador to Colombia (1957–1959), Yugoslavia (1959–1961), Egypt and Sudan (1961–1964), the USSR (1964–1980) and Mongolia (1974–1980); a Companion of the Order of Canada
 Daniel Fried (B.A. 1974) – career diplomat; United States Ambassador to Poland (1997–2000) 
 William vanden Heuvel (Bachelor and Law, editor-in-chief of Cornell Law Review) – U.S. Ambassador to the European office of the United Nations (1977–79) and United States Deputy Ambassador to the United Nations (1979–1981) 
 John H. Holdridge (1948–1950 Chinese language) – United States Ambassador to Singapore (1975–1978), United States Ambassador to Indonesia (1982–1986)
 Jerome H. Holland (B.S. 1939, M.S. 1941) – First black member of the New York Stock Exchange; president of Delaware State University (1953–60) and Hampton University (1960–70); United States Ambassador to Sweden, 1970–73; chairman of the American Red Cross, 1979–85
 Makila James ('79) – United States Ambassador to Swaziland (2012–2016)
 Alan Keyes (undergrad 1968–69, transferred) – diplomat, U.S. Presidential candidate, 1996, 2000; U.S. Senate candidate from Maryland (1988, 1992) and Illinois (2004)
 Edwin Jackson Kyle (M.S. 1902) – United States Ambassador to Guatemala, 1945–48; namesake of Kyle Field
 Sol Linowitz (J.D. 1938, trustee, 1966–95) – diplomat, ambassador, chairman of Xerox, 1960–66; Presidential Medal of Freedom recipient, 1998
 Simon Mbilinyi (BSc) – Tanzanian Ambassador to Belgium and Luxembourg, 1985–1989; Minister of Finance (1995–1996)
 C. Steven McGann (1975–1978 graduate studies) – United States Ambassador to Fiji, Kiribati, Nauru, Tonga, and Tuvalu (2008–2011)
 Francisco de Miguel (M.A. 1985) – Spanish career diplomat, Spain's Ambassador to Libya
 Cameron Munter (B.A. 1976) – United States Ambassador to Serbia (2007–2009), United States Ambassador to Pakistan (2010–2012)
 Michael Punke (J.D. 1989) – United States Ambassador to the World Trade Organization (2011– )
 G. Frederick Reinhardt (M.A. 1935) – career diplomat, U.S. Ambassador to South Vietnam (1955–1957), to the United Arab Republic and North Yemen (1960–1961) and to Italy (1961–1968)
 Hu Shih (B.A. 1914) – China's Ambassador to the U.S., 1938–42; philosopher; poet
 Moncrieff J. Spear (B.A. 1946) – former American diplomat
 Willard Straight (BArch 1901) – diplomat, investment banker, publisher, World War I veteran, namesake of Willard Straight Hall
 Sao-Ke Alfred Sze (B.A. 1901) – China's Ambassador to the U.S. and later UK; founding member of World Bank; first Chinese student to attend Cornell
 Sandra Louise Vogelgesang – United States Ambassador to Nepal (1994–1997)
 Ali Jehangir Siddiqui - Ambassador of Pakistan to the United States (2018), Diplomat, Businessman, Special Assistant to the Prime Minister of Pakistan (2017-2018), Pakistan's Ambassador at Large for Foreign Investment (2019-2022).

Notable judges and lawyers

 Floyd Abrams (B.A. 1956) – co-counsel for the "Pentagon Papers" case
 Ronnie Abrams (B.A. 1990) – federal judge of the United States District Court for the Southern District of New York (2012–)
 Simon L. Adler (LL.B. 1889) – United States district judge of the United States District Court for the Western District of New York
 Barry T. Albin (J.D. 1976) – associate justice of the New Jersey Supreme Court
 Mark J. Bennett (J.D. 1979) – Attorney General of Hawaii, federal judge of the U.S. Court of Appeals for the Ninth Circuit 
 Richard M. Berman (B.S. 1964) – senior judge of the United States District Court for the Southern District of New York
 Boris Bittker (B.A. 1938) – Yale Law School professor emeritus; author
 William F. Bleakley (LL.B. 1904) – New York Supreme Court Justice, first Westchester County Executive, 1936 Republican nominee for Governor of New York
 Frederic Block (LL.B. 1959) – senior judge of the United States District Court for the Eastern District of New York
 Robert Boochever (B.A. 1939, J.D. 1941) – senior judge of the United States Court of Appeals for the Ninth Circuit; chief justice of the Alaska Supreme Court
 Leonie Brinkema (J.D. 1976) – U.S. District Court judge
 David Buckel (J.D. 1987) – U.S. LGBT rights lawyer; environmentalist 
 Zachary W. Carter (B.A. 1972) – United States Attorney for the Eastern District of New York
 George B. Clementson (LL.B. 1892) – author of The Road Rights and Liabilities of Wheelmen, the first treatise on bicycle law
 Brian Cogan (J.D. 1979) – federal judge of the United States District Court for the Eastern District of New York
 Christopher C. Conner (B.A. 1979) – federal judge of the United States District Court for the Middle District of Pennsylvania
 Paul A. Crotty (LL.B. 1967) – federal judge, Southern District of New York
 Leonard C. Crouch (Ph.B. 1889) – New York Supreme Court judge; New York Court of Appeals justice
 William H. Cuddeback (B.A. 1874) – New York Court of Appeals judge
 Mary H. Donlon (LL.B. 1920) – U.S. Customs Court judge; first female editor-in-chief of the Cornell Law Quarterly and of a U.S. law review
 Henry White Edgerton (A.B. 1910) – justice of the United States Court of Appeals for the D.C. Circuit
 Nancy Garlock Edmunds (B.A. 1969) – judge of the United States District Court for the Eastern District of Michigan
 Harry T. Edwards (B.A. 1962 industrial & labor relations) – chief judge of the United States Court of Appeals for the D.C. Circuit in Washington, D.C.; professor at New York University School of Law; former professor at Duke, Georgetown, Harvard, Pennsylvania, and Michigan law schools; author
 John T. Elfvin (B.E.E. 1942 electrical engineering) – federal judge of the U.S. District Court for the Western District of New York
 Dana Fabe (B.A. 1973) – chief justice of the Alaska Supreme Court 
 Thomas E. Fairchild (B.A. 1934) – senior justice (1981–2007) of the United States Court of Appeals for the Seventh Circuit 
 Peter T. Farrell (B.A. 1922) – Queens County Court judge; presided over the trial of bank robber Willie Sutton
 Phillip S. Figa (J.D. 1976) – federal judge of the United States District Court for the District of Colorado
 Paul L. Friedman (B.A. 1965) – senior judge of the United States District Court for the District of Columbia
 Charles Garside (LL.B. 1923) – New York City municipal judge, notable in New York State Government legal affairs
 Nina Gershon (B.A. 1962 English) – United States magistrate judge of the United States District Court for the Southern District of New York; senior judge of the United States District Court for the Eastern District of New York
 Douglas H. Ginsburg (B.S. 1970) – chief judge of the United States Court of Appeals for the District of Columbia Circuit
 Michael Goldsmith (B.S. 1972, J.D. 1975) – RICO expert; ALS advocate
 William E. Grauer (B.A. 1971, J.D. 1974) – chair of the Standing Committee on Discipline for the United States District Court for the Southern District of California; chair of the Ethics Committee of the San Diego County Bar Association; partner at Cooley LLP
 Peter W. Hall (J.D. 1977) – justice of the United States Court of Appeals for the Second Circuit
 Emily C. Hewitt (A.B. 1966) – chief judge of the United States Court of Federal Claims
 Frank H. Hiscock (A.B. 1875) – chief justice of the New York Court of Appeals; chairman of Cornell Board of Trustees, and decided the Chester Gillette murder case.
 David N. Hurd (B.S. 1959) – federal judge of the U.S. District Court, Northern District of New York
 Edith Jones (B.A. 1971 economics) – justice of the Fifth Circuit Court of Appeals
 Gail Laughlin (Law 1898) – lawyer; suffragist; member of the Maine State Senate
 Peter Marx - television host; information law attorney; technology business consultant; producer
 Barbara Milano Keenan (B.A. 1971) – justice of the United States Court of Appeals for the Fourth Circuit; justice of the Supreme Court of Virginia; justice of the Virginia Court of Appeals 
 Gladys Kessler (B.A. 1959) – senior judge for the United States District Court for the District of Columbia
 Theodore W. Kheel (B.A. 1935, law 1937) – attorney; labor mediator
 H. David Kotz (J.D. 1990) – Inspector General of the SEC
 John A. Kronstadt (B.A. 1973) – justice of the Los Angeles County Superior Court; judge of the United States District Court for the Central District of California
 Frederick Bernard Lacey (LL.B. 1948) – federal judge of the U.S. District Court for the District of New Jersey 
 Kenneth K. Lee (B.A. 1997) – federal justice of the U.S. Court of Appeals for the Ninth Circuit 
 Leonard Leo (B.A. 1986, J.D. 1989) – executive vice-president of the Federalist Society
 Lloyd Francis MacMahon (B.A. 1936, LL.B. 1938) – federal judge of the United States District Court for the Southern District of New York
 Louis W. Marcus (LL.B. 1889) – justice of the New York Supreme Court
 Andrew J. McDonald (B.A.) – associate justice of the Connecticut Supreme Court; member of the Connecticut Senate
 L. Londell McMillan (B.S. 1987 ILR) – entertainment attorney; publisher
 Sherman Moreland (LL.B. 1894) – associate justice of the Supreme Court of the Philippines
 Alison J. Nathan (B.A. 1994, J.D. 2000) – editor-in-chief of the Cornell Law Review; federal judge for the United States District Court for the Southern District of New York
 Paul C. Ney Jr. (B.S. 1980 biology) – General Counsel of the Department of Defense of United States
 Edward Nottingham (B.A. 1969) – United States federal judge in the United States District Court for the District of Colorado
 Walter Chadwick Noyes (1888) – United States Court of Appeals for the Second Circuit judge
 Edward R. O'Malley (LL.B. 1891) – former New York Attorney General; justice of the New York Supreme Court
 Anne M. Patterson (J.D. 1983) – associate justice of the New Jersey Supreme Court
 Marsha J. Pechman (B.A. 1973) – Federal judge (1999–2011), Chief Federal judge (2011–) of the United States District Court for the Western District of Washington
 Pamela Pepper (J.D. 1989) – Judge of the United States District Court for the Eastern District of Wisconsin (2014–)
 Philip Perry (J.D. 1990) – General Counsel for the Department of Homeland Security
 Cuthbert W. Pound (1887 law professor) – member of New York State Senate; chief justice of the New York Court of Appeals
 Sharon Prost – chief justice of the United States Court of Appeals for the Federal Circuit
 Leonardo Quisumbing (LL.M.) – Associate Justice of the Supreme Court of the Philippines
 Aubrey Eugene Robinson, Jr. (B.A. 1943, LL.B. 1947) – senior judge of the United States District Court for the District of Columbia
 Robin S. Rosenbaum (B.A. 1988) – United States District Court for the Southern District of Florida judge
 Max Rosenn (B.A. 1929) – U.S. Court of Appeals for the Third Circuit judge
 Barbara Jacobs Rothstein (B.A. 1960) – chief judge of the United States District Court for the Western District of Washington; senior judge of the United States District Court for the District of Columbia
 Amy J. St. Eve (B.S. 1987, J.D. 1990) – federal justice of the United States Court of Appeals for the Seventh Circuit 
 Karen Gren Scholer (J.D. 1982) - District Judge United States District Court for the Northern District of Texas
 Frederic Palen Schoonmaker (B.A. 1891) – federal judge for the United States District Court for the Western District of Pennsylvania
 Leah Ward Sears (B.S. 1976) – chief justice of the Supreme Court of Georgia
 Sang-Hyun Song (J.S.D. 1970) – judge (2003–2015) and president (2009–2015) of the International Criminal Court
 Jonathan R. Steinberg (B.A. 1960) – justice of the United States Court of Appeals for Veterans Claims
 Harold Montelle Stephens (A.B. 1909) – chief justice of the United States Court of Appeals for the D.C. Circuit
 Joseph L. Tauro (LL.B. 1956) – federal judge for the United States District Court for the District of Massachusetts
 Harry Taylor (1893) – Associate Justice of the New York Supreme Court, Appellate Division, Fourth Department (1924–1936). Provided the legal advice that elevated the American League to major league status as a rival to the National League. Taylor financed his legal education by playing professional baseball with the Louisville Colonels.
 Elbert Tuttle (B.A. 1918, LL.B. 1923) – chief justice, U.S. Court of Appeals; ruled on many fundamental 1954 civil-rights cases
 Richard C. Wesley (J.D. 1974) – justice of the United States Court of Appeals for the Second Circuit

Medal of Honor recipients
 Alan Louis Eggers – United States Army sergeant, World War I; awarded for heroic actions near Le Catelet, France
 Webb Hayes (attended 1873–1875) – United States Army brigadier general, Philippine–American War; awarded for rescue of captives at Vigan Island
 Matt Urban (Matty L. Urbanowitz, B.A. 1941, history, government) – United States Army (1941–46) lieutenant colonel, World War II; awarded for valorous actions in France and Belgium

Other government

 Carol Aichele (B.A.) – Secretary of the Commonwealth, Pennsylvania (2011–2015)
 Steve Aichele (B.A. 1970) – former Chief of Staff of Governor Tom Corbett
 Nicole Alexander-Scott (B.Sc. 1997) — Director of the Rhode Island Department of Health
 Alan A. Altshuler (B.A.) – Massachusetts Secretary of Transportation (1971–1975); former dean of the Harvard Graduate School of Design and of the Graduate School of Public Administration at New York University; fellow of the American Academy of Arts and Sciences (1997)
 Jane Amero (B.A. 1963) – member of Maine Senate (1992–2000)
 Irma Anderson (B.S. Nursing) – Mayor of the city of Richmond, California (2001–2006)
 Patrice M. Arent (J.D. 1981) – member of the Utah House of Representatives (January 1, 1997 – December 31, 2002, January 1, 2011–) and the Utah State Senate (January 1, 2003 – December 31, 2006) 
 Michael Atkinson (J.D. 1991) – Inspector General of the Intelligence Community, involved in the Trump–Ukraine scandal
 Byron M. Baer – member of the New Jersey General Assembly (1972–1993) and of the New Jersey Senate (1994–2005)
 Roy E. Baldwin (B.S. 1970)  –  member of Pennsylvania House of Representatives (2002–present) 
 Calvin Barton (1899) – Mayor of Norwalk, Connecticut (1921–1923)
 Ruth Bascom (Master's in Social Psychology) – first female mayor of Eugene, Oregon (1993–1996)
 Bob Bastian (Veterinary Medicine 1963) – member of the Pennsylvania House of Representatives (1999–2008)
 George Bell, Jr. (LL.B., 1894), United States Army Major General who commanded the 33rd Infantry Division in World War I and later the United States VI Corps
 George A. Blauvelt (1890) – member of the New York State Assembly (1911, 1912) and of the New York State Senate (1913, 1914)
 Peter Bowman (B.S. 1960 electrical engineering) – member of the Maine Senate (2006–2010)
 William B. Broydrick – Wisconsin politician
 Terry Calvani (J.D. 1972) – commissioner of the Federal Trade Commission (1983–1990)
 Robert Cardillo (B.A. 1983 government) – director of the National Geospatial-Intelligence Agency (2014–2019)
 David Carlucci (B.S. 2002, ILR) – member of the New York Senate (January 1, 2011–)
 Nelson W. Cheney (B.A. 1899) – member of the New York State Assembly (1916–1929) and of the New York State Senate (1930–1938)
 Derek Chollet (B.A. 1993) – Assistant Secretary of Defense for International Security Affairs (2012–2014)
 Parley Parker Christensen – Utah and California politician, Esperantist
 Bruce C. Clarke – United States Army general
 Clem S. Clarke (two years, Geology) – oilman and Republican politician from Shreveport, Louisiana
 David S. Cohen (B.A. 1985, Government) – Deputy Director of the CIA (2015–17, 2021-), Assistant Secretary for Terrorist Financing (2009–2011)
 Mandy Cohen (B.S. 2000) – Secretary of the North Carolina Department of Health and Human Services
 Ernest E. Cole (B.S. 1895) – Commissioner of Education of the State of New York, 1940–1942
 Rhonda Cornum (PhD 1980 biochemistry and nutrition) – former United States Army Brigadier general; former prisoner of war
 Edwin L. Crawford – first county executive of Broome County, New York
 Clifford W. Crouch (AAS 1965, dairy science) – member of the New York State Assembly
 Walter Cruickshank (B.A. Geological Sciences) – deputy director and then acting director of US Bureau of Ocean Energy Management
 Charles d'Autremont (1868–1871) – Mayor of Duluth, Minnesota
 Melissa DeRosa (B.A.) – Executive Secretary to Governor Andrew Cuomo
 Samuel B. Dicker (1911) – 58th Mayor of Rochester, New York (1939–1955)
 Elizabeth B. Drewry (PhD 1933) – archivist with the National Archives and director of the Franklin D. Roosevelt Presidential Library and Museum 
 Harriet Drummond (B.S. 1974) – member of the Alaska House of Representatives (2013– )
 María del Rosario Guerra de La Espriella (M.S. Agricultural Economy) – Minister of Information Technologies and Communications of the Government of Colombia (2006–2010) and Senator of Colombia (2014–)
 Anthony Fauci (M.D. 1966) - Chief Medical Advisor to the U.S. President during the COVID-19 pandemic
 Robert Flanagan (J.D. 1974) – secretary of the Maryland Department of Transportation (2003–2007) and member of the Maryland House of Delegates (1987–2003)
 John Ford – member of the New York State Senate (1896–1900)
 Stephen Friedman (B.A. 1959; trustee, 1993–) – chairman of the President's Foreign Intelligence Advisory Board (2005–2009); former assistant for economic policy to President George W. Bush (2002–2004) and director of the United States National Economic Council, 2003–04; former chairman of the Goldman Sachs Group, 1990–94
 Vincent J. Gentile (B.A.) – member of the New York State Senate (1997–2002) and of the New York City Council (2003–2017) 
 Kim Gillan (Masters 1975) – member of the Montana House of Representatives (1996–2004) and of the Montana Senate (2004–2012)
 Armando Samper Gnecco (B.S. 1943 agricultural economy) – Minister of Agriculture of Colombia
 Richard N. Gottfried (B.A. 1968) – member of the New York State Assembly since 1971; more than 40 years
 W. Scott Gould (A.B.) -  United States Deputy Secretary of Veterans Affairs, 2013-2017
 Jesse Root Grant (undergrad 1874–77, dropped out) – son of U.S. President Ulysses S Grant
 Geoffrey Gratwick (post-doctoral fellowship) – physician and member of the Maine Senate (2012–)
 Mark J. Green (B.A. 1967) – government consumer-affairs activist, New York Public Advocate (1994–2001)
 Jo Handelsman (B.S. 1979) – associate director for science at the White House Office of Science and Technology Policy (2014–2017); member of the American Academy of Arts and Sciences (2019)
 Howard Hart – Central Intelligence Agency officer
 Isaac Herzog – Israeli politician
 John Hillen (MBA) – 15th Assistant Secretary of State for Political-Military Affairs (2005–2007)
 Dennis Hollingsworth (Dairy Science) – member of California State Legislature (2000–2010)
 Clinton T. Horton (B.A. 1898, LL.B. 1899) – member of the New York State Assembly (1912–1914) and of the New York State Senate (1915–1916); Justice of the New York Supreme Court (1922–1935)
 Edward M. House (undergrad 1877–80, dropped out) – Foreign policy advisor for Woodrow Wilson and Franklin Delano Roosevelt
 Alyson Huber (B.S.) – member of the California State Assembly (2008–2012); judge of the Superior Court of Sacramento County in California (2012–)
 Tony Hwang (B.S.) – member of the Connecticut House of Representatives (2009–2015) and of the Connecticut Senate (2015–)
 Henry W. Jeffers (B.S. 1899) – chairman of the New Jersey Republican State Committee (1935–1937); inventor of the Rotolactor
 Phyllis Kahn (A.B. 1957 physics) – member of the Minnesota House of Representatives for more than 40 years (1973–)
 Florence Kelley (B.A. 1882) – political and social reformer
 Donald Kerr (B.S. 1963) – assistant director of the F.B.I.; former director of Los Alamos National Laboratory
 Akhlaqur Rahman Kidwai (PhD 1950) – Governor of Bihar (1979–85, 1993–98), West Bengal (1998–1999), and Haryana (2004–2009), India
 Stephen D. Krasner (B.A. 1963) – Director of Policy Planning at the U.S. State Department, professor of political science at Stanford University
 Celso Lafer (PhD 1970) – Foreign Minister (1992–1992, 2001–2002) and Commerce Minister (1999–1999) of Brazil
 Gail Lavielle (B.A. English) – member of the Connecticut House of Representatives (2011–)
 Chih-Kung Lee (M.S. 1985, PhD 1987) – Minister of Economic Affairs of the Republic of China (2016–)
 Harold O. Levy (B.A. 1974, J.D. 1977) – Chancellor of New York City Schools 2000–2002
 David R. Macdonald (B.S. 1952) – United States Assistant Secretary of the Treasury (Enforcement, Operations, and Tariff Affairs) (1974–1976), Under Secretary of the Navy (1976–1977), Deputy U.S. Trade Representative (1981–1983)
 William Magee (bachelor's degree 1961, agricultural economics) – Democratic Member of the New York State Assembly
 Bajrakitiyabha Mahidol (LL.M. 2002, J.S.D. 2005) – Princess of Thailand
 Stanley Makowski (attended with a certificate from ILR) – Mayor of the City of Buffalo, New York (1973–1977)
 Debbie Matz (B.S.) – Chairman of the National Credit Union Administration (NCUA) (2009–2016)
 Kyle E. McSlarrow – Deputy Secretary of the U.S. Department of Energy
 Dan Meuser – Secretary of Revenue of Pennsylvania (2011–2015)
 Daneek Miller – member of the New York City Council from the 27th District (January 1, 2014–)
 Wheeler Milmoe (A.B. 1917) – member of the New York State Assembly 1934–1952 and New York State Senate (1953–1958) 
 Yatarō Mishima (M.A) – 8th Governor of the Bank of Japan (1913–1919)
 E. Blackburn Moore – member (1933–1967), Speaker (1950–1967) of the Virginia House of Delegates
 Sherman Moreland (B.Litt. 1892, LL.B. 1894) – member of the New York State Assembly (1903–1907) and Associate Justice of the Supreme Court of the Philippines
 Becky Morgan (B.S. 1960) – California State Senator (1984–1993)
 Svante Myrick (A.B. 2009) – Mayor of Ithaca, New York (2012– ); former member of Ithaca Common Council for the 4th Ward
 Benjamin Nichols (B.S. 1946, M.S. 1949) – Cornell professor of electrical and computer engineering and Socialist mayor of Ithaca (1989–1995)
 Kenneth Nichols (B.S., M.S. civil engineering) – United States Army Major General and an engineer who worked on the Manhattan Project; member of the National Academy of Engineering (1968)
 Michael F. Nozzolio (Bachelor's ILR, Master's in Public Administration and Agricultural Economics) – former member of the New York State Assembly (1983–1992) and the New York State Senate (1993–)
 Iyabo Obasanjo-Bello (PhD 1994) – former Nigerian Senator (2007–2011); daughter of former Nigerian President Olusegun Obasanjo
 William O'Brien (attended 2 years, mechanical engineering) – member of the Minnesota House of Representatives (1963–1967), 11th Minnesota State Auditor (1969–1971)
 Napsiah Omar (B.S. Nutrition and Education) – Malaysian educator and politician
 Bill O'Neill – member of the New Mexico Legislature (2009–)
 Shih-wei Pan (M.A. PhD ILR) – former Minister of Labor of the Republic of China
 John M. Paxton, Jr. (B.S. 1973, MEng 1974) – major general, United States Marine Corps, Assistant Commandant of the Marine Corps 
 Ralph Perlman (Bachelor's) – Louisiana state budget director, 1967–1988
 Charles Gilbert Peterson – Mayor of Lockport, New York; contractor
 Fred B. Pitcher (B.S. 1888) – New York State Senator (1919–1922)
 Lim Chuan Poh (MBA 1993) – Singaporean civil servant and former army general who served as Chief of Army (1998–2000) and Chief of Defence Force (2000–2003) of the Singapore Armed Forces
 Juan Carlos Esguerra Portocarrero (LL.M. 1973) – Minister of National Defence of Colombia (1995–1997) and Justice and Law of Colombia (2011–2012); Ambassador of Colombia to the United States (1997–1998)
 Roberto Prats (B.A. 1990 public political analysis and economics) – Senator of Puerto Rico
 Samuel Rabin – member of the New York State Assembly (1945–1954); New York Supreme Court Justice 
 Charlie Rodríguez (B.A. 1976 in Government and History) – 11th president of the Senate of Puerto Rico (1997–2000)
 Martin Romualdez (B.A. 1985 government) – member of the House of Representatives of the Philippines (2007–)
 Anna Roosevelt Halsted (did not graduate) – daughter of U.S. President Franklin Roosevelt
 Chang San-cheng (PhD 1981) – Taiwanese politician who was Premier of the Republic of China from February 1, 2016 until May 20, 2016
 Joseph D. Scholtz (B.A. 1912) – Mayor of Louisville, Kentucky (1937–1941)
 Martha Schrader (B.A.) – member of the Oregon Senate (2009–2011); Clackamas County, Oregon Commissioner (2003–2009, 2012–)
 José Serra (M.A., PhD Economics) – Brazilian politician who served as a Brazil Congressman, Senator, Minister of Planning and Minister of Health, Mayor of São Paulo and Governor of São Paulo state
 Raj Shah (B.A. 2006 government) – principal deputy press secretary at The White House
 Miriam Shearing (B.A. philosophy) – Justice of the Supreme Court of Nevada (1993–2005)
 Joseph Simons (A.B. 1980 economics and history) – chairman of the Federal Trade Commission (2018–)
 Samuel S. Slater (B.L. and LL.B. 1894) – member of the New York State Assembly (1899–1900) and of the New York State Senate (1901–1902)
 Gayle Slossberg (B.S. 1987) – Connecticut State Senator (2005–)
 William T. Smith (1938) – member of the New York State Senate (1963–1986)
 Robert Sopuck (M.S. 1975) – member of Canadian Parliament (2010–)
 Ellen Spiegel (B.S. 1984, consumer economics and public policy) – member of the Nevada Assembly (2008–)
 Karen Spilka (B.A.) – Massachusetts State Senator (2005–); member of the Massachusetts House of Representatives (2001–2005)
 David A. Stafford (B.A. 1917) – brigadier general in the United States Marine Corps
 Melanie Stansbury (M.S. 2007) – member of the New Mexico House of Representatives (2019–present)
 Thomas J. Surpless (1900) – member of the New York State Assembly (1906–1909) 
 Gaye Symington (M.B.A. 1983) – member (1996–2009), Speaker (January 5, 2005 – January 8, 2009) of the Vermont House of Representatives
 Huang Ta-chou (PhD 1971 agriculture) – mayor of Taipei (1990–1994)
 Mamintal A.J. Tamano (LL.M. 1958) – Filipino statesman; former Senator of the Philippines
 Rick Taylor (Master's 1998 ILR) – member of the Pennsylvania House of Representatives (2007–2010)
 Martín Travieso (Law 1903) – member of the Puerto Rico Senate (1917–1921), Mayor of San Juan, Puerto Rico (1921–1923), 4th Chief Justice of the Supreme Court of Puerto Rico (1944–1948)
 James S. Truman (Ph.B. 1896, LL.B. 1898) – member of the New York State Senate (1925–1928)
 Ting-kuei Tsay (PhD 1982) – vice-chairman of Taiwan's Environmental Protection Administration, 2002–2004
 Wu Tsung-tsong (M.S. 1983, PhD 1987) – minister without portfolio, Executive Yuan, Republic of China (2016–)
 Alexander Vindman American foreign affairs specialist serving on the U.S. National Security Council as director for European Affairs
 William Wallace, Baron Wallace of Saltaire (PhD) – scholar and Liberal Democrat peer
 Andrew C. Weber – Assistant Secretary of Defense for Nuclear, Chemical & Biological Defense Programs; Obama administration
 Roy P. Wilcox (LL.B. 1897) – Wisconsin politician
 Henry D. Williams – member of the New York State Assembly (1918) and of the New York State Senate (1925–1930)
 Mitchell Van Yahres (B.S. 1949) – Mayor of Charlottesville, Virginia (1970–1972) and member of the Virginia House of Delegates (1981–2005)
 Frank L. Young (B.A. 1888) – member of the New York State Assembly (1909–1912);  Justice of the New York Supreme Court (1922–1930)

Business

Founders

James Altucher (B.S. 1989, Computer Science) - founder of Reset Inc., StockPickr
Richard Baker (B.S. 1988, hotel administration) – founder, president, and CEO of NRDC Equity Partners and Hudson's Bay Company, the owner of Saks Fifth Avenue, Gilt Groupe, Lord & Taylor, The Bay, Home Outfitters, Zellers, and Fields
 André Balazs (class of 1979) – hotelier and businessman
Aldo Bensadoun (attended, transferred) – billionaire founder and executive chairman of the ALDO Group
Amit Bhatia (B.S. 2001) – founder of Swordfish Investments; vice chairman of Queen's Park Rangers
Wendell Brown (B.S. 1982) – co-founder of Teleo, eVoice, LiveOps, and Nularis
Daniel Cane (B.S. 1997) – co-founder of Blackboard Inc.
Willis Carrier (M.E. 1901) – founder of Carrier Corporation; inventor of air conditioning
 Gerald Cassidy (J.D. 1967) – co-founder and CEO of Cassidy & Associates
Steve Conine (B.S. 1995) – billionaire co-founder of Wayfair
Joseph Coors (B.Chem. 1939, chemical engineering 1940) – co-founder of The Heritage Foundation
Mac Cummings (B.A. 2001) – co-founder of Terakeet Corporation; director of Internet Finance
Tom Dinwoodie (B.S. 1978, civil and environmental engineering) – Cleantech entrepreneur, inventor, and founder of SunPower Corporation Systems (formerly PowerLight Corporation)
Ira Drukier (B.S. 1966 engineering) – hotelier and philanthropist, who donated US$25 million in December 2014 to establish the Drukier Institute for Children's Health at the Weill Cornell Medical College
David Duffield (B.E.E. 1962, M.B.A. 1964) – billionaire co-founder of PeopleSoft and Workday
John S. Dyson (B.S. 1965) – creator of the "I Love NY" campaign; owner of Millbrook Vineyards and Winery
David Edgerton (B.A. 1947, hotel administration) – co-founder of Burger King Corporation
David Einhorn (B.A. 1991) – founder and president of Greenlight Capital; billionaire hedge fund manager
Chuck Feeney (B.S. 1956 hotel administration) – co-founder of Duty Free Shoppers Group; founder and director of Atlantic Philanthropies; founder of General Atlantic; billionaire philanthropist who has given away more than $8 billion
Russell W. Galbut (B.S. 1974 hotel administration) – co-founder of Crescent Heights, a real estate development company
Frank Gannett (B.A. 1898) – founder of Gannett, the largest U.S. newspaper publisher; namesake of Gannett Health Center
 Art Gensler (BArch 1958) – founder and chairman of Gensler
Stephen Gilfus (B.S. 1997) – co-founder of Blackboard Inc. sold to Providence Equity for $1.6 billion.
Paul Graham (B.A.) – co-founder of Viaweb, sold for $46.6 million to Yahoo! and became Yahoo! Stores; Lisp programmer, author, founder of Y-Combinator
Leroy Grumman (B.S. 1916 mechanical engineering) – founder of Grumman Aerospace Corporation; recipient of the Medal for Merit (1948)
Myra Hart (B.A. 1962, M.B.A. 1981, trustee, 1999–) – one of four co-founders of Staples, Inc.; professor at Harvard Business School
Jeff Hawkins (B.S. 1979 electrical engineering) – founder of Palm, Inc. and Handspring; inventor of the Palm Pilot; member of the National Academy of Engineering (2003)
Christopher Hemmeter (B.S. 1962, hotel administration) – founder and chairman of Hemmeter Companies
Irwin M. Jacobs (B.E.E. 1956) – billionaire, co-founder and chairman of Qualcomm; UCSD and MIT engineering professor, pioneer of CDMA wireless technology, philanthropist; recipient of numerous awards including National Medal of Technology and Innovation (1994), Marconi Prize (2011), IEEE Medal of Honor (2013); member of the National Academy of Engineering (1982)
Stephen A. Jarislowsky (B.S. 1946 mechanical engineering) – billionaire businessman and philanthropist; founder, chairman, and CEO of Jarislowsky Fraser Limited
Seth Klarman (B.A. 1979) – founder and chairman of the Baupost Group; hedge fund manager, billionaire
Jules Kroll (B.A. 1963) – founder of Kroll Inc. and the modern investigations, intelligence, and security industry; responsible for tracking the assets of Jean-Claude Duvalier, Ferdinand and Imelda Marcos, and Saddam Hussein
Robert S. Langer (B.S. 1970, chemical engineering) – founder of Moderna
David Litman (1979, 1982) – founder and CEO of Hotels.com
Yossi Maiman – founder and owner of the Merhav Group, shareholder of the East Mediterranean Gas Company, and former chairman, chief executive officer and president of the Ampal-American Israel Corporation
James McLamore (B.A. 1947, hotel administration) – co-founder of Burger King Corporation
Gary Mendell (B.S. 1979 hotel administration) – founder, chairman, and CEO of HEI Hotels & Resorts
Robert Warren Miller (B.S. 1955, hotel administration) – billionaire co-founder of Duty Free Shoppers Group
Howard Milstein (B.A. 1973) – billionaire real estate developer, financier, and philanthropist; chairman, president and chief executive officer of New York Private Bank & Trust
Jeff Morgan (B.S. City and Regional Planning) – founder of Global Heritage Fund
Rohan Murty (B.S. Computer Science) – founder of Murty Classical Library of India
Floyd R. Newman (B.S. 1912 chemistry) – founder of Allied Oil Company of Cleveland
Drew Nieporent (B.S. 1977 hotel administration) – founder of Myriad Restaurant Group
Franklin W. Olin (B.C.E. 1886) – founder of Olin Corporation; gave gift to build Olin Hall in memory of his son Franklin W. Olin, Jr.
John M. Olin (B.S. 1913 chemistry) – founder of John M. Olin Foundation, president, Olin Corporation; namesake of Olin Library
Spencer Truman Olin (B.S. 1921 mechanical engineering) – industrialist and philanthropist; an executive of the Olin Corporation; Republican Party leader
Peter Busch Orthwein (B.S. 1968, MBA 1969) – co-founder and chairman of Thor Industries
Nathaniel A. Owings – founding partner of Skidmore, Owings and Merrill (SOM)
 James Rockwell (B.S. 1904 engineering)  – architect and president of Meralco
Harris Rosen (B.S. 1961 hotel administration) – founder of Rosen Hotels and Resorts; major donor of Rosen College of Hospitality Management (which was renamed due to his major donation)
Rob Ryan (B.A. 1969) – founder and chairman of Ascend Communications
William Sanders (B.S. 1964) – founder of LaSalle Partners (later merged to form Jones Lang LaSalle); founder and chairman of Security Capital Group Incorporated; former chairman of the National Association of Real Estate Investment Trusts (NAREIT)
Niraj Shah (born 1973/74) (B.S. 1995) – billionaire CEO and co-founder of Wayfair
Leonard Schleifer (B.S. 1970) – founder and CEO of Regeneron Pharmaceuticals; billionaire
Seth M. Siegel (B.S. 1974, J. D. 1978) – founder of The Beanstalk Group
Robert F. Smith (B.S. chemical engineering) – billionaire investor; founder, chairman and CEO of Vista Equity Partners; ranked by Forbes in 2015 as 268th richest man in America, and the second wealthiest African-American
Elmer Ambrose Sperry – founder of Sperry Corporation, known for his invention of Gyrostabilizer and the Gyrocompass; recipient of John Fritz Medal (1927) and Elliott Cresson Medal from the Franklin Institute (1929), member of the National Academy of Sciences (1925)
Clarence W. Spicer (engineering student) – founder of what is now Dana Holding Corporation; engineer, inventor, known for invention of Universal joint; inductee into the Automotive Hall of Fame
John A. Swanson (B.S. 1962, M.S. 1963) – founder of ANSYS and John Fritz Medal winner; member of the National Academy of Engineering (2009)
Jake Swirbul (attended) – co-founder of Grumman Aerospace Corporation
Michael Tien (B.S. 1972 electrical engineering) – founder and chairman of the apparel retail company G2000
Robert V. Tishman (1937) – founder of Tishman Speyer Properties
Robert I. Toll (B.A. 1963) – billionaire, co-founder of Toll Brothers
Deena Varshavskaya – founder and CEO of Wanelo
 Tien Tzuo (B.S. 1990 electrical engineering) – founder and CEO of Zuora
Jay Walker (B.S. 1977 industrial relations) – founder of Priceline.com; founder and chairman of Walker Digital, billionaire on Forbes list of the world's billionaires ($1.6 billion in 2000)
Colston Warne (bachelor's 1920, master's 1921 economics) – co-founder of the Consumers Union and its Consumer Reports monthly magazine and served as its president for 43 years; professor of economics at Amherst College (1930–1969)
Sanford I. Weill (B.A. 1955 government) – billionaire, former chairman and CEO of Citigroup; founder of Shearson Loeb Rhoades, sold for $930 million to American Express; namesake of Weill Cornell Medical College
David F. Welch (PhD 1985 electrical engineering) – co-founder, president of Infinera Corp; member of the National Academy of Engineering (2016)
Justin DuPratt White (1890) – co-founder of White & Case law firm; trustee of the Cornell University Board of Trustees (1928–1939)
Robin Wolaner (B.S. 1975 industrial and labor relations) – founder of Parenting Magazine
John Zimmer (B.S. 2006 hotel administration) – co-founder and COO of Zimride; co-founder and president of Lyft

Chairpersons, CEOs, and executives

 Keith Barr (B.S. 1992 hotel administration) – CEO of InterContinental Hotels Group (IHG) (2017–) 
 Carl Bass (B.A. 1983 mathematics) – former CEO and president of Autodesk (2006–2017)
 Al Bernardin (1952) – creator of the McDonald's Quarter Pounder; former vice president of Product Development for McDonald's
 Mark Bertolini (MBA 1984) – CEO and president of Aetna
 Jeffrey Bleustein (B.S. 1960, B.M.E 1961) – chairman and former CEO of Harley Davidson
 Joseph H. Boardman (B.S. agriculture economics) – president and CEO of Amtrak (2008–2016), 11th Federal Railroad Administrator (2005–2008), New York State Commissioner of Transportation (1997–2005)
 Val A. Browning (B.S. 1917) – president of Browning Arms Company, American soldier in WWI 
 Walter S. Carpenter, Jr. (undergrad 1906–09, dropped out) – president (1940–48) and chairman (1948–62) of DuPont
 Abby Joseph Cohen (B.A. 1973 economics and computer science, trustee) – partner and Senior Investment Strategist of Goldman Sachs; president of Global Markets Institute (GMI), Goldman Sachs
 Jennie Chua (B.S. 1971, hotel administration) – CEO of Capitaland Residential, former CEO of Raffles Holdings
 Heather Cho (B.S. 1999, hotel) – former VP of Korean Air, fired after Nut Rage incident 
 Adolph Coors II (B.A. 1907) – second president of Coors Brewing Company
 Pete Coors (B.S. 1969 industrial engineering) – executive of Coors Brewing Company; Senatorial candidate, 2004
 Luciano Coutinho (PhD economics) – president of the Brazilian Development Bank (BNDES)
 Eric Daniels (B.A. 1973) – former CEO of Lloyds Banking Group
 Alonzo G. Decker, Jr. (B.S. 1929 electrical engineering) – former president, CEO and chairman of the board of Black & Decker; known for developing power tools for use in home, including the first cordless electric drill 
 Kenneth T. Derr (B.S. 1959 mechanical engineering, M.B.A. 1960, trustee) – chairman and CEO of Chevron, 1989–99
 Dave Dombrowski (undergrad 1974–75, transferred) – president, CEO, and general manager of the Detroit Tigers
 Jennifer Dulski (B.A., MBA) – president and chief operating officer of Change.org
 Henry D. Edelman (J.D. 1973) – president and CEO of Federal Agricultural Mortgage Corporation (Farmer Mac) (1989–2008)
 Reggie Fils-Aimé (B.S. 1983 applied economics) – president and COO of Nintendo of America (2006–2019)
 Stephen Friedman (B.A. 1959; trustee, 1993–) – chairman of The Goldman Sachs Group, 1990–94; chairman of the President's Foreign Intelligence Advisory Board (2005–09); former Assistant for Economic Policy to President George W. Bush (2002–04); director of the United States National Economic Council, 2003–04
 J. Patrick Gallagher Jr (B.A. government) – president, CEO and chairman of Arthur J. Gallagher & Co.
 Pawan Kumar Goenka – managing director of Mahindra & Mahindra Ltd, an Indian multinational automobile manufacturing corporation headquartered in Mumbai, Maharashtra, India; chairman of SsangYong Motor Company in Korea
 Harvey Golub (attended 1956–1958) – president (1991–1993), chairman and CEO (1993–2001) of American Express; chairman of the board at the Campbell Soup Company (2004–2009); chairman of the American International Group (AIG) (2009–2010); chairman of the board of Advisors of Miller Buckfire (2011–)
 Byron Grote (PhD 1981 quantitative analysis) – chief financial officer of BP
 Raj Gupta (M.S. 1969 operations research) – chairman, CEO and president of Rohm and Haas, chairman of Delphi Automotive (2015–)
 Robert Harrison (B.A. 1976 government) – CEO of the Clinton Global Initiative and chairman of the Cornell University Board of Trustees; Rhodes Scholar
 Dan Hesse (MBA 1977) – CEO of Sprint Nextel
 Matthew Hiltzik (B.S. 1994, ILR) – president and CEO of Hiltzik Strategies, a strategic consulting and communications firm
 D. Brainerd Holmes (B.S. 1943 electrical engineering) – best known for directing NASA's crewed spaceflight program from September 1961 to June 1963; president of Raytheon (1976–1986) and chairman of Beechcraft; member of the National Academy of Engineering (1977)
 F. Kenneth Iverson (1946, aeronautical engineering) – president of Nucor Steel (1967–1998); inductee into the American Metal Market Steel Hall and the American National Business Hall of Fame; recipient of the National Medal of Technology and Innovation (1991) and member of the National Academy of Engineering (1994)
 Walter C. Johnsen (B.S 1973, Master of Engineering (chemical) 1974) – chairman and CEO of Acme United Corporation 
 Robert D. Kennedy (B.S. 1954 mechanical engineering) – chairman, president and CEO of Union Carbide (1986–1995)
 Shaygan Kheradpir (bachelor's, master's and doctorate 1979–1987 electrical engineering) – CEO of Juniper Networks 
 Jeff Jacobson (M.S. ILR) – CEO of Xerox Corporation (2017–)
 Ken Jautz (B.A.) – executive vice president of CNN; former foreign correspondent for the Associated Press; former CNN bureau chief in Germany
 Herbert Fisk Johnson, Jr. (B.A. 1922 chemistry) – president of S. C. Johnson & Son; benefactor and namesake of the Herbert F. Johnson Museum of Art on campus
 Herbert Fisk Johnson III (5 Cornell degrees 1979–86) – billionaire, CEO of S. C. Johnson & Son; benefactor and Trustee Emeritus of Cornell
 Samuel Curtis Johnson, Jr. (B.A. 1950 economics) – billionaire, chairman of S. C. Johnson & Son; benefactor and co-namesake of the S.C. Johnson Graduate School of Management
 S. Curtis Johnson (B.S. 1977) – billionaire, former chairman of Diversey
 Helen Johnson-Leipold (B.A. 1978 psychology) – billionaire businesswoman; chairman of Johnson Financial Group, chairman and CEO of Johnson Outdoors 
 Winnie Johnson-Marquart (B.S. 1981) – billionaire, president of the Johnson Family Foundation
 Thomas W. Jones (B.A. 1969, M.R.P. 1972, trustee) – principal of TWJ Capital LLC
 Paul L. Joskow (B.A. 1968) – president of the Alfred P. Sloan Foundation since 2008, economist
 Charles F. Knight (1957, MBA 1959) – chairman (1974–2004), CEO (1973–2000) and president (1986–1988, 1995–1997) of Emerson Electric Company
 Douglas Leone (B.S. 1979 mechanical engineering) – venture capitalist and a partner at Sequoia Capital; billionaire
 Oscar G. Mayer, Jr. (1934) – chairman of Oscar Mayer
 Timothy Mayopoulos (B.A. 1980) – president and CEO of Fannie Mae (2012–2018)
 Lowell McAdam (M.E. 1976) – chairman and CEO of Verizon
 Mary Meeker (MBA 1986 finance) – venture capitalist and former Wall Street securities analyst
 Peter C. Meinig (B.M.E 1962) – chairman and CEO of HM International, LLC
 Charles N. Mills (B.S. 1983, MBA 1984) – CEO of Medline Industries (1997–)
 Jon R. Moeller (B.S. 1986, MBA 1988) – CFO of Procter & Gamble
 Brian A. Murdock (B.S. 1978 economics) – president and CEO of Strategic Investment Group (2014–) and former chairman and CEO of TD Asset Management (2009–2013)
 Thomas Murphy (B.S. 1945) – former chairman and CEO of Capital Cities/ABC, Inc.; Television Hall of Fame, NATPE Lifetime Achievement Award (1996)
 Dayssi Olarte de Kanavos (B.A. 1985) - President and COO of Flag Luxury Group
 Lubna Olayan (B.S. 1977) – CEO of the Olayan Financing Company, the holding entity for the Olayan Group's operations in the Kingdom of Saudi Arabia and the Middle East
 Salil Parekh (M.E.) – CEO and managing director of Infosys (2018–)
 James Wentworth Parker (class of 1908) – president and general manager of Detroit Edison Company (1943–1951) and of the American Society of Mechanical Engineers (1942–1943)
 William D. Perez (B.A. 1969 government) – CEO of Wm. Wrigley, Jr. Company, CEO of Nike, Inc., 2004–06
 Victor Peng (MEng, electrical engineering) – president and CEO of Xilinx (2018–)
 Sandi Peterson (B.A.) – Group Worldwide chairman for Johnson & Johnson
 Joseph N. Pew, Jr. (M.E. 1908) – vice president (1912–1947) and chairman (1947–1963) of Sun Oil Company; founder of The Pew Charitable Trusts; namesake of Pew Engineering Quad
 James Pitaro (B.S. 1991) – president of ESPN
 Georges Plassat – chairman and chief executive officer of Carrefour (2012–2017)
 Lewis Platt (B.S. 1964 mechanical engineering) – CEO of Hewlett-Packard (1992–99); chairman of Boeing, 2003–05
 Michael B. Polk (B.S. IEOR) – CEO of Newell Brands (2011–)
 Robert Purcell – chairman of Cornell University Board of Trustees (1968–1978)
 Justin Rattner (B.S. 1970 electrical engineering, M.S. 1972 computer science) – chief technology officer of Intel, ABC News Person of the Week for his work on the ASCI Red system (fastest computer in the world, 1996–2000), R&D Magazines "Scientist of the Year", 1989
 Bruce S. Raynor (B.S. 1972 industrial & labor relations) – president of UNITE HERE
 Kevin Reilly (B.A. 1984) – president of NBC Entertainment (2004–2007), president (2007–2012) and chairman (2012–2014) of entertainment at Fox, president of TBS and TNT (2014–)
 Irene Rosenfeld (B.S. 1975, M.S. 1977, PhD 1980) – CEO and chairwoman of Kraft Foods
 Frank Rosenfelt (LL.B. 1950) – former CEO of Metro-Goldwyn-Mayer (MGM) Studio
 Jon Rubinstein (B.S. 1978, MEng 1979) – CEO of Palm, Inc., Apple SVP 1997–2006; member of the National Academy of Engineering (2005)
 Demir Sabancı (MBA 1999) – Turkish entrepreneur, venture capitalist, and philanthropist
 Joe Saddi (MBA 1983) – chairman of Booz & Company
 Vicki Saporta (class of 1974) – president and CEO of the National Abortion Federation (1995–)
 Robert Selander (B.S. 1972) – president and CEO of MasterCard (1997–2010)
 Daniel Schwartz (B.S. 2001 applied economics and management) – CEO of Restaurant Brands International (Burger King Corporation)
 Steven Sinofsky (B.A. 1987) – president of Windows and Windows Live Engineering at Microsoft
 Charles E. Sporck (B.M.E. 1950) – microelectronics pioneer; co-founded the Semiconductor Industry Association; CEO and president of National Semiconductor (1967–1991)
 Kyung-Bae Suh (M.B.A. 1987) – billionaire, chairman, CEO and owner of Amorepacific Corporation
 Larry Tanenbaum (B.S. 1968) – chairman of Maple Leaf Sports & Entertainment
 Ratan Tata (BArch 1962) – billionaire, chairman of Tata Group, India's wealthiest business group, 1991–2012
 Myron Charles Taylor (LL.B. 1894) – chairman and CEO of U.S. Steel (1932–38); namesake of Taylor Hall; Medal for Merit recipient
 Walter C. Teagle (B.S. 1899, trustee, 1924–54) – president and chairman of Standard Oil of New Jersey (now ExxonMobil); namesake of Teagle Hall
 Andrew Tisch (B.S. 1971, hotel administration) – chairman of Loews Corporation
 James S. Tisch (B.A. 1975) – CEO of Loews Corporation
 Fred Tomczyk (B.S. 1977) – CEO of TD Ameritrade; former president and chief executive officer of London Life Insurance Company 
 Arnold Tremere – executive director, government official (Canadian International Grains Institute)
 Rick Tsai (PhD 1981) – CEO of Taiwan Semiconductor Manufacturing Company
 Harold Uris (B.S. 1925, trustee 1967–1972) – real estate investor and builder; namesake of Uris Hall
 Sophie Vandebroek (PhD) – chief technology officer of Xerox and president of Xerox Innovation Group (2006–)
 Randi Weingarten (B.S. 1980 ILR) - president of the United Federation of Teachers (1998−2008) and of the American Federation of Teachers (2008−)
 Barry Weiss – chairman and CEO of Island Def Jam and Universal Motown Republic
 Stephen H. Weiss (class of 1957) – an American investment banker, philanthropist, and former chairman of the Cornell University Board of Trustees (1989–1997)
 Tim Wentworth (B.S. ILR) – CEO and president of Express Scripts (2016–)
 Mark Whitacre (PhD nutritional biochemistry) – COO of Cypress Systems 
 Fuganto Widjaja (B.A. 2003) – Indonesian billionaire businessman
 Lynton Wilson (M.A. economics) – president and CEO of Redpath Industries Ltd. (1981–1988); vice-chairman of the Bank of Nova Scotia; at various times president, COO, CEO, and chairman of the board of BCE Inc. (1990–2000); president and CEO of BCE Inc. (1992–1993); chairman of Nortel Networks (2000–2005); chairman of CAE Inc.; chancellor of McMaster University (2007–2013); Officer of the Order of Canada; recipient of honorary degrees from six Canadian universities
 Dennis Woodside (B.S. 1991) – CEO of Motorola Mobility; president of Google America
 Teddy Zee (B.S. 1979) – Film Producer/Media & Technology Executive
 Robert D. Ziff (J.D. 1992) – billionaire co-CEO of Ziff Brothers Investments
 Stephen Zinser – American-born, London-based hedge fund manager who co-founded the European Credit Management, a financial firm based in London, and served as its CEO

Natural sciences and related fields
See: List of Cornell University alumni (natural sciences).

Social sciences

Anthropology and sociology
 Carol Aneshensel (B.S., M.A., PhD) – sociologist; professor and vice chair for the Department of Community Health Sciences in the School of Public Health, University of California, Los Angeles
 Sarah T. Barrows (M.A. 1893) - American phonetician, phonetics pioneer
 Edward Bernays (B.S. 1912 agriculture) – public relations practitioner, author of Propaganda
 Ken Blanchard (B.A. 1961, PhD 1967) – management consultant, co-author of The One Minute Manager
 Alfred Blumstein (B.A., PhD) – criminologist and former dean of the Heinz College at Carnegie Mellon University; member of the National Academy of Engineering (1998)
 Aaron Cicourel (PhD) – professor emeritus of sociology at the University of California, San Diego; fellow of the American Academy of Arts and Sciences (1992) and of the American Association for the Advancement of Science (1982)
 Kimberlé Crenshaw (B.A. 1981): founder of critical race theory, highly influential black feminist and race theorist
 Harry Edwards (PhD 1970) – sociologist noted for work on race and sports, Professor Emeritus at University of California, Berkeley
 Shelly Errington (M.A., PhD) – cultural anthropologist and a professor of anthropology at the University of California, Santa Cruz; MacArthur Fellow (1981)
 Diana E. Forsythe (PhD 1974) – anthropologist at the University of California, San Francisco noted for her work on artificial intelligence and medical informatics
 Daniel A. Foss (B.A.) – sociologist, author of Beyond Revolution: A New Theory of Social Movements (1986), Freak Culture: Life Style and Politics (1972)
 Ward Goodenough (B.A. 1940) – anthropologist at the University of Pennsylvania; member of the National Academy of Sciences (1971), fellow of the American Academy of Arts and Sciences (1975) 
 Sabine Hyland (B.A. 1986) – anthropologist; Professor of World Christianity at the University of St Andrews known for her studies on khipus and religion in Peru; Guggenheim Fellow (2019)
 Suzanne Maman  – social scientist and HIV/AIDS researcher
 Erik Mueggler (B.A.) – anthropologist; professor at the University of Michigan; MacArthur Fellow (2002)
 John Naisbitt (graduate study) – best-selling writer in the area of futures studies
 Tom Peters (B.C.E. 1965, M.C.E. 1966) – business management motivational guru
 Mary Racelis (B.A. 1954) – anthropologist; sociologist; professor at Ateneo de Manila University and University of the Philippines Diliman; UNICEF Regional Director in Eastern and Southern Africa (1983–1992)
 David M. Schneider (B.S. 1940, M.S. 1941) – cultural anthropologist known for his studies of kinship; former William B. Ogden Distinguished Service Professor Emeritus in Anthropology, and chairman of Anthropology (1963–1966) at the University of Chicago 
 G. William Skinner (B.A. 1947, PhD 1954) – anthropologist and sinologist best known for his delineation of the physiographic macroregions of China; member of the National Academy of Sciences (1980)
 Julian Steward (B.A. 1925 zoology and biology) – anthropologist best known for his development of a scientific theory of cultural evolution; member of the National Academy of Sciences (1954)
 Stanley Jeyaraja Tambiah (PhD 1954) – social anthropologist and Esther and Sidney Rabb Professor (Emeritus) of Anthropology at Harvard University; recipient of Balzan Prize (1997) and Fukuoka Asian Culture Prize (1998); member of the National Academy of Sciences (1994)
 Mildred Bertha Thurow Tate (PhD 1935) rural sociologist
 Brackette Williams (B.S. 1973) – anthropologist; MacArthur Fellow (1997)

Economics

 Alice Amsden (B.A. 1965) – Barton L. Weller Professor of Political Economics at Massachusetts Institute of Technology (1999–2012)
 Luc Anselin (M.A. 1979, PhD 1980) – one of the principal developers of the field of spatial econometrics; member of the National Academy of Sciences (2008) and fellow of the American Academy of Arts and Sciences (2011)
 Hugh E. Conway – labor economist, college professor, and construction industry expert
 Maureen L. Cropper (M.A. 1972, PhD 1973 economics) – distinguished university professor at the University of Maryland, College Park; member of the National Academy of Sciences (2008)
 Frank Fetter (M.A. 1892 philosophy) – economist who served as president of the American Economic Association (1912–1913); member of the American Academy of Arts and Sciences 
 Austin Frakt (B.S. 1994) – health care economist; founder of The Incidental Economist
 Robert Gilpin (M.S. 1954) – scholar of international political economy, professor emeritus of Politics and International Affairs at the Woodrow Wilson School of Public and International Affairs at Princeton University, fellow of the American Academy of Arts and Sciences
 Claudia Goldin (B.A. magna cum laude 1968) – economist; member of the National Academy of Sciences (2006)
 Sanjeev Goyal (M.A. 1989, PhD 1990 economics) – professor of economics, University of Cambridge and a fellow of the British Academy
 Ricardo Hausmann (PhD 1981) – former Venezuelan Minister and ex-Chairman of the IMF – World Bank Development Committee
 Charles Henry Hull (1886) – economist and historian; former dean of the College of Arts of Cornell University
 Paul L. Joskow (B.A. 1968) – economist, distinguished fellow of the American Economic Association, fellow of the Econometric Society and Industrial Organization Society and of the American Academy of Arts and Sciences; Elizabeth and James Killian Professor of Economics, Emeritus at MIT, past department chair of MIT Department of Economics; current president of the Alfred P. Sloan Foundation since 2008
 Ehud Kalai (M.S. 1971, PhD 1972) – game theorist, mathematical economist, and James J. O’Connor Distinguished Professor of Decision and Game Sciences at Northwestern University; Fellow of the American Academy of Arts and Sciences and the Econometric Society
 Edwin W. Kemmerer (PhD 1903) – economist at Princeton University who served as president of the American Economic Association (1926), known internationally as "The Money Doctor"; fellow of the American Academy of Arts and Sciences (1934)
 Frank H. Knight (PhD 1916) – influential scholar-economist, one of the original leaders of the "Chicago School" of economic theory
 Alan Krueger (B.S. 1983) – labor economist and former chief economist for the US Department of Labor; chair of the Council of Economic Advisers, 2011–2013
 John Williams Mellor (BSc 1950; MSc 1951; PhD)
 Sendhil Mullainathan (B.A. 1993) – behavioral economist at Harvard, co-founder of MIT Poverty Action Lab, MacArthur Foundation "genius grant" recipient (2002), Infosys Prize (social sciences) recipient (2018)
 Edwin Griswold Nourse (1906) – agricultural economist; first chairman of the US Council of Economic Advisers (1946–49); president of the American Economic Association (1942) and vice president of the Brookings Institution; Guggenheim Fellows; Fellow of the American Academy of Arts and Sciences (1934)
 George Rea (1915) – first paid president of the New York Curb Exchange
 Thorstein Veblen (graduate study 1891–92, transferred) – economist, author of The Theory of the Leisure Class

Government

 Benedict Anderson (PhD 1967) – Aaron L. Binenkorb Professor Emeritus of International Studies, Government & Asian Studies at Cornell University; best known for his book Imagined Communities
 Gordon G. Chang (B.A. 1973, J.D. 1976) – author of The Coming Collapse of China and Nuclear Showdown : North Korea Takes On the World; one of the original set of Student Trustees
 George Friedman (PhD 1976) – director of the political analysis and forecasting think tank Stratfor; author of The Next 100 Years: A Forecast for the 21st Century (2009)
 Everett Carll Ladd (PhD) – political scientist; director of the Roper Center for Public Opinion Research at the University of Connecticut
 John Mearsheimer (PhD 1980) – international relations theorist and Professor of Political Science at University of Chicago; known for his book on offensive realism, The Tragedy of Great Power Politics and his New York Times best-seller The Israel Lobby and U.S. Foreign Policy
 Ruth McVey (PhD 1961) – co-author, Cornell Paper
 Suzanne Mettler (PhD 1994) – American political scientist and author
 Lee Poh Ping (PhD 1974) - Malaysian political scientist at the University of Malaya; prominent contributor to the field of international relations and Japanese studies in Malaysia 
 Stephen Skowronek (PhD 1979) – Pelatiah Perit Professor of political and social science at Yale
 William Irwin Thompson (PhD 1966; professor) – cultural historian, social critic, poet, philosopher of science
 Wang Shaoguang (PhD 1990) – Chinese political scientist and leading member of the Chinese New Left; professor at Chinese University of Hong Kong
 James Weinstein (B.A. 1949 government) – author and publisher of In These Times

Psychology
 John Wallace Baird (PhD 1902 psychology) – Canadian psychologist who served as the 27th president of the American Psychological Association (1918)
 I. Madison Bentley (PhD 1899) – 34th president of the American Psychological Association (1925–1926); former faculty member and department chair of the Psychology Department at Cornell University
 Edwin G. Boring (1908, PhD 1915 psychology; instructor of psychology 1913–1918) – experimental psychologist and historian of psychology; president of the American Psychological Association (1928), member of the National Academy of Sciences (1932)
 Urie Bronfenbrenner (B.A. 1938 psychology and music; Jacob Gould Schurman Professor Emeritus of Human Development and Psychology) – psychologist, pioneer in developmental psychology (Ecological Systems Theory), founder of the field of human ecology; co-founder of national Head Start program
 Joyce Brothers (B.S. 1947) – author, psychologist, and television personality
 Karl M. Dallenbach (PhD 1913; faculty member 1916–1948) – experimental psychologist and editor of the American Journal of Psychology
 John E. Exner (PhD 1958 clinical psychology) – psychologist known for Exner system of scoring
 J. P. Guilford (PhD 1927) – psychologist at the University of Southern California who served as the president of the American Psychological Association (1950); member of the National Academy of Sciences (1954)
 Suzanne Bennett Johnson (B.A. 1970 psychology) – psychologist who served as the president of the American Psychological Association (2012)
 James Maas (M.A., PhD; Professor of Psychology) – psychologist, coined the term "power nap"
 Abraham Maslow (undergrad 1928–29, transferred) – psychologist best known for Maslow's hierarchy of needs; president of the American Psychological Association (1968)
 Helen Neville (PhD Neuropsychology) – psychologist and neuroscientist at the University of Oregon; member of the National Academy of Sciences (2014); fellow of the American Academy of Arts and Sciences and of the American Psychological Society
 Frank Parsons (B.S. civil engineering) – founder of the field of vocational psychology.
 Walter Bowers Pillsbury (PhD 1896) – psychologist who was on faculty with the University of Michigan for his entire career; president of the American Psychological Association (1910–1911), member of the National Academy of Sciences (1925)
 Frank Rosenblatt (A.B. 1950, PhD 1956) – psychologist in the field of artificial intelligence; inventor of the perceptron algorithm.
 Elizabeth Spelke (PhD) – cognitive psychologist; psychology professor at the University of Pennsylvania, Cornell University, MIT and Harvard University; fellow of the Society of Experimental Psychologists, the American Academy of Arts and Sciences and the American Association for the Advancement of Science; member of the National Academy of Sciences; recipient of the 2009 Jean Nicod Prize 
 Robert Spitzer (B.A. 1953 psychology) – professor of psychiatry at Columbia University, known for modernizing classification of mental disorders and recognizing homosexuality as a non-mental disorder
 Louis Leon Thurstone (Master of Mechanical Engineering 1912) – pioneer in the fields of psychometrics and psychophysics; He conceived the approach to measurement known as the law of comparative judgment, and is well known for his contributions to factor analysis; president of the American Psychological Association (1933); co-founder and first president of the Psychometric Society (1936); Fellow of the American Statistical Association and member of the National Academy of Sciences (1938)
 Margaret Floy Washburn (PhD 1894) – psychologist, first female PhD in psychology; president of the American Psychological Association (1921–1922); member of the National Academy of Sciences (1931)

Humanities

Philosophy

 Marilyn McCord Adams (PhD 1967) – philosopher; Fellow of the American Academy of Arts & Sciences (2015)
 Francis Fukuyama (B.A.) – philosopher, political economist, and professor at Johns Hopkins University
 Edmund Gettier – philosopher and professor emeritus at the University of Massachusetts Amherst; owes his reputation to a single three-page paper published in 1963 called "Is Justified True Belief Knowledge?"
 Matthew Kramer (B.A. 1981, philosophy) – philosopher, professor of Legal and Political Philosophy at the University of Cambridge; Fellow of the British Academy (2014); Guggenheim Fellow (2001–2002)
 John Warwick Montgomery (A.B. 1952) – lawyer, professor, theologian and academic known for his work in the field of Christian apologetics
 Thomas Nagel (B.A. 1958) – philosopher, author of What is it like to be a bat? and Balzan Prize recipient (2008)
 George Ashton Oldham (A.B. 1902) – Episcopal bishop, peace activist, and writer
 Dominik Perler (visiting scholar 1991–1992) – professor of philosophy at the Humboldt University of Berlin; Gottfried Wilhelm Leibniz Prize recipient (2005) 
 John Perry (PhD 1968) – Henry Waldgrave Stuart Professor of Philosophy Emeritus at Stanford University and Distinguished Professor of Philosophy Emeritus at the University of California, Riverside; Jean Nicod Prize laureate (1999); member of the American Academy of Arts and Sciences (2002) and of the Norwegian Academy of Science and Letters
 David H. Sanford (PhD 1966) – professor of philosophy at Duke University
 J. B. Schneewind (B.A.) – professor emeritus of Philosophy at Johns Hopkins University, former dean of the College of Arts and Sciences at the University of Pittsburgh and former provost of Hunter College CUNY; fellow of the American Academy of Arts and Sciences
 May Gorslin Preston Slosson (PhD 1880) – suffragist, first woman in the United States to get her PhD in philosophy
 Samuel Weber (PhD 1960) – Avalon Foundation Professor of Humanities at Northwestern University; professor at the European Graduate School in Saas-Fee, Switzerland
 Jessica Wilson (PhD 2001) – professor of philosophy at the University of Toronto
 Paul Ziff (B.F.A. 1949, PhD 1951) – artist and philosopher specializing in semantics and aesthetics

Literature

 Diane Ackerman (M.F.A. 1973 poetry, M.A. 1976, PhD 1978) – author, poet, and naturalist
 Gerald Taiaiake Alfred (M.S. 1992, PhD 1994) – scholar, author, and adviser to indigenous nations
 Melissa Bank (M.F.A. 1998) – best-selling author; The Girls' Guide to Hunting and Fishing, a bestseller in both the United States and the United Kingdom, and The Wonder Spot, a novel, have been translated into over thirty languages
 Morris Bishop (B.A. 1913, M.A. 1914, PhD 1926; Professor of Romance Literature) – biographer, author, humorist, wrote the preeminent history of the university, A History of Cornell
 Harold Bloom (B.A. 1951) – literary and cultural scholar-critic; Sterling Professor of Humanities at Yale University; MacArthur Fellow (1985)
 Susan Brownmiller (B.A. 1956) – feminist author and activist
 Louis Bromfield (1914–1916 agriculture) – Pulitzer Prize winner for best novel for Early Autumn (1927) and pioneer of innovative scientific farming concepts
 Pearl S. Buck (M.F.A. 1924) – author, novelist, and winner of the Pulitzer Prize in 1932 and Nobel Prize in Literature in 1938
 NoViolet Bulawayo (M.F.A. 2010) – Zimbabwean author of We Need New Names
 Murray Burnett (B.A. 1931) – author of the play Everybody Comes to Rick's, which was turned into the film Casablanca
 George Lincoln Burr (B.A. 1881; John Stambaugh Professor of History 1888–?) – U.S. historian, diplomat, author, and educator
 Fiona Cheong (B.A. English; M.F.A. Creative Writing) – author of The Scent of the Gods, nominated for a National Book Award (1991)
 George Cockcroft (B.A. 1954) – author, The Dice Man; uses the pen name Luke Rhinehart
 Junot Díaz (M.F.A. 1995) – critically acclaimed, Pulitzer Prize-winning short-story writer; MacArthur Fellowship (2012)
 Alice Dunbar-Nelson (attended 1907–1908) – poet, journalist, political activist, Harlem Renaissance influence
 Jane Duran – Cuban-born poet, recipient of the Forward Poetry Prize (1995) and the Cholmondeley Award (2005)
 Barry Eisler (J.D. 1989) – author, novelist
 Sarah Elbert (B.A 1965, M.A 1966, PhD 1974) – scholar
 Richard Fariña (B.A. 1962 English) – author, Been Down So Long It Looks Like Up to Me; folk singer
 Jessie Redmon Fauset (B.A. 1905) – author from the Harlem Renaissance
 Nick Fowler (B.A. 1989) – musician, poet, author, A Thing (or Two) About Curtis and Camilla
 Alice Fulton (M.F.A. 1982; Ann S. Bowers Distinguished Professor of English) – poet, author, feminist, MacArthur Fellow (1991)
 William H. Gass (PhD 1954 philosophy) – author, essayist
 C. S. Giscombe (M.F.A. 1975) – poet and professor of English at University of California, Berkeley; recipient of American Book Award for Prairie Style  (2008)
 Martin Hägglund (PhD 2009 comparative literature) – literary theorist, philosopher
 Lynne Hanley (B.A. English) – literary critic
 E. D. Hirsch (B.A., 1950) – literary critic and educational theorist
 Laura Howes (B.A. English) – scholar of Middle English literature
 Minfong Ho (B.A. Economics) – Chinese-American author
 Laura Z. Hobson – author, Gentleman's Agreement Clifford Irving (B.A. 1951) – author of the Howard Hughes biography hoax
 Michelle Knudsen (B.A. 1995 English) – New York Times best-selling American author of 47 books for young readers
 Anne LaBastille (B.A. 1955, PhD 1969) – author and award-winning conservationist
 Jean Lee Latham (B.A., M.A.) – writer specialized in biographies for children or young adults and Newbery Medal recipient (1956) for her book Carry On, Mr. Bowditch Victor LaValle (B.A. English) – author
 Philipp Meyer (B.A. English) – fiction writer and author of American Rust and The Son James H. Morey (M.A. 1987, PhD 1990) – Medievalist and professor of English at Emory University
 Toni Morrison (M.A. 1955 M) -best-selling author; The Bluest Eye and Beloved. Nobel Prize in Literature. Presidential Medal of Freedom.
 Lorrie Moore (M.F.A. 1982) – prize-winning short-story writer and novelist
 Manuel Muñoz (M.F.A. 1998) – award-winning author and professor of creative writing
 Ira B. Nadel (PhD 1970) – prize-winning biographer and literary critic
 George Jean Nathan (1904) – author, critic
 Iddo Netanyahu (did not graduate) – Israeli physician, author and playwright; younger brother of Benjamin Netanyahu
 Nicholas Nicastro (B.A. 1985 English, M.A. 1991 archaeology, PhD 2003 psychology) – historical novelist
 Téa Obreht (MFA 2009) – novelist, The Tiger's Wife Stewart O'Nan (MFA 1992) – novelist, Drue Heinz Literature Prize-winning author for In the Walled City in 1993, author of Snow Angels Julie Orringer (B.A. 1994 English) – short-story writer and novelist
 Thomas Perry (B.A. 1969) – novelist, Edgar Award winner
 Darryl Ponicsan (M.A. 1965) – writer best known as the author of the 1971 novel The Last Detail Seksan Prasertkul (M.A., PhD 1989 political science) – Thai author, National Artist of Thailand (literature)
 Michael Punke (J.D. 1989) – author of The Revenant: A Novel of Revenge, adapted as the film The Revenant Thomas Pynchon (B.A. 1959 English) – author, Gravity's Rainbow and The Crying of Lot 49; MacArthur Fellow (1988)
 Kenneth Roberts (B.A. 1908) – novelist, Northwest Passage Laura Riding (attended 1918–21) – poet, novelist, essayist, short story writer, leader in modernism
 Matt Ruff (B.A. 1988) – author, Fool on the Hill Joanna Russ (B.A. 1957 English; professor) – feminist author, The Female Man Ira Sadoff (B.S. 1966 ILR) – poet, novelist, critic, True Faith 2012, Grazing 1999, Barter 2003
 Kirkpatrick Sale (B.A. 1958 history) – independent scholar and author
 Eve Kosofsky Sedgwick (undergrad) – critical theorist, literature professor
 Elsie Singmaster – author, Swords of Steel Gayatri Chakravorty Spivak (PhD 1967 comparative literature) – post-colonialist theorist, Can the Subaltern Speak?; winner of Kyoto Prize in Arts and Philosophy; university professor at Columbia University
 Ellen Stekert – folklorist and folk musician
 William Stokoe (B.A. 1941, PhD 1946 English) – pioneered research on American Sign Language; co-authored A Dictionary of American Sign Language on Linguistic Principles (1965), the first attempt to systematically represent and characterize ASL phonology, Stokoe notation creator
 William Strunk Jr. (PhD 1896; professor) – author of The Elements of Style Hendrik Willem van Loon (1905; Professor of History 1915–17) – author of the first book to be awarded the Newbery Medal for an outstanding contribution to children's literature
 William T. Vollmann (B.A., Comparative Literature, 1977) – novelist, journalist, war correspondent, short story writer, and essayist.
 Kurt Vonnegut (undergrad 1941–1944) – author, Slaughterhouse-Five, Cat's Cradle, and Breakfast of Champions Lauren Weisberger (B.A. 1999 English) – author, The Devil Wears Prada and Everyone Worth Knowing E. B. White (B.A. 1921) – author, Charlotte's Web and Stuart Little; co-author of The Elements of StyleHistory
 Glenn C. Altschuler (PhD 1976) – Thomas and Dorothy Litwin Professor of American Studies and vice president for University Relations at Cornell University
 Barbara Watson Andaya (PhD 1975) – professor of Asian studies at the University of Hawaii and director of the Center for Southeast Asian Studies
 Leonard Andaya (PhD 1972) – professor of Southeast Asian history at the University of Hawaii
 John L. Brooke (B.A. 1975) – Arts & Sciences Distinguished Professor of History at Ohio State University; recipient of Bancroft Prize (1995)
 Edward Countryman (M.A. 1969, PhD 1971) – American historian and educator; recipient of Bancroft Prize (1982)
 Nancy F. Cott (B.A. 1967) – historian, Sterling Professor of History and American Studies at Yale University and Jonathan Trumbull Professor of American History at Harvard University; member of the American Academy of Arts and Sciences
 Charlotte J. Erickson (M.A. 1947, PhD 1951) – historian, the Paul Mellon Professor of American History at the University of Cambridge (1983–1990); MacArthur Fellow (1990) and Guggenheim Fellow (1966–1967) 
 Louis R. Gottschalk (A.B. 1919, A.M. 1920, PhD 1921) – professor of history (1927–1965), department chair (1937–1942), Gustavus F. and Ann M. Swift Distinguished Service Professor of History (1959–1965) at the University of Chicago
 Henry Guerlac (B.A. 1932 chemistry, M.A. 1933 biochemistry) – historian of science considered among the pioneers in the development of the academic field of the history of science; president of the History of Science Society (1957–1960), recipient of the George Sarton Medal (1973)
 Marie Boas Hall (PhD 1949) – historian of science; fellow of the American Academy of Arts and Sciences (1955) and of the British Academy (1994), recipient of the George Sarton Medal (1981)
 Charnvit Kasetsiri (PhD 1972) – Thai historian and former president of Thammasat University
 Dominick LaCapra (B.A., Faculty 1969–) – Bryce and Edith M. Bowmar Professor of Humanistic Studies at Cornell University; member of the American Academy of Arts and Sciences (2006)
 Frederic C. Lane (B.A. 1921) – historian in Medieval history, professor emeritus of history at Johns Hopkins University; president of the American Historical Association (1964–1965); fellow of the American Academy of Arts and Sciences and of the Medieval Academy of America
 Melvyn P. Leffler (B.S. 1966) – American historian and educator, Edward Stettinius Professor, former chairman of the Department of History, dean of the college and Graduate School of Arts & Sciences at the University of Virginia; recipient of the George Louis Beer Prize (2008) and Bancroft Prize (1993) 
 William Leuchtenburg (B.A. 1943) – historian, William Rand Kenan Jr. professor emeritus of history at the University of North Carolina at Chapel Hill; recipient of Bancroft Prize and North Carolina Award for Literature
 William McNeill (PhD 1947) – historian, professor emeritus of History at the University of Chicago; author of The Rise of the West: A History of the Human Community; recipient of the National Humanities Medal (2010)
 Anthony Milner (PhD) – Basham Professor of Asian History, School of Culture, History & Language, Australian National University
 David Oshinsky (B.S. 1965, M.S. 1967) – historian, winner of the Pulitzer Prize for History in 2006 for his book Polio: An American Story, Jack S. Blanton, Sr. Chair Emeritus in History at The University of Texas at Austin, Distinguished Scholar in Residence, New York University 
 Milton Osborne (PhD) – Australian historian, author, and consultant specializing in Southeast Asia
 Laura Otis (PhD 1991 comparative literature) – historian of science and Professor of English at Emory University; MacArthur Fellow (2000)
 Richard Pipes (graduate of 1945) – historian in Russian history; fellow of the American Academy of Arts and Sciences; recipient of National Humanities Medal (2007)
 Merle Calvin Ricklefs (PhD) – scholar of the history and current affairs of Indonesia
 Clinton Rossiter (1939; professor 1947–1970) – historian and political scientist; recipient of the Bancroft Prize (1954) and the Woodrow Wilson Foundation Award (1953)
 James Morton Smith (PhD 1951) – historian; recipient of a Guggenheim Fellowship (1960); director of the Winterthur Museum, Garden and Library (1976–1984)
 Kazys Varnelis (M.A. 1990, PhD 1994) – historian and theorist of architecture, specializing in network culture
 Olin Dunbar Wheeler (1874) – historian, author, topographer, wrote especially about the Lewis and Clark Expedition
 David K. Wyatt (PhD 1966) – John Stambaugh Professor of History and Asian Studies, Emeritus, Cornell University

Religion
 Georgia Harkness (1912) American Methodist theologian and philosopher
 Homer Alexander Jack (B.A. 1936, M.S. 1937, PhD 1940) – Unitarian Universalist minister and early activist for peace, disarmament, racial equality and social justice; Niwano Peace Prize (1984), Jamnalal Bajaj Award (1992)
 Rabbi David Saperstein (B.A.) Reform Jewish leader, former United States Ambassador-at-Large for International Religious Freedom

Music

 Robert Alexander Anderson (1916) – composer, wrote Christmas song "Mele Kalikimaka"
 Russ Barenberg – Grammy–nominated bluegrass musician
 Herbert Barrett (B.A. 1930) – talent manager for hundreds of famous artists from the 1930s to 2000s
 Harry Chapin (dropped out) – folk musician, "Cat's in the Cradle"
 Henrique de Curitiba (M.F.A. 1981) – Polish-Brazilian composer
 Mack David – eight-time Academy Award nominee for songs including "Bibbidi Bobbidi Boo"
 Jeremy Dussolliet (B.S. 2009) – Grammy-nominated singer-songwriter and member of the duo Kinetics & One Love
 Jared Emerson-Johnson (B.A. 2003) – video game music composer
 Richard Fariña – folk musician
 Joscelyn Godwin (PhD 1969 musicology) – musicologist, translator, historian of the esoteric
 Greg Graffin (PhD 1991 evolutionary biology) – lead singer and co-founder of Bad Religion
 Laurens Hammond (B.S. 1916 mechanical engineering) – inventor of the Hammond organ
 Jesse Harris (B.A.) – Grammy Award-winning songwriter who wrote "Don't Know Why" and "Come Away with Me", songs popularized by the artist Norah Jones
 Ari Hest (attended, transferred) – singer-songwriter
 John S. Hilliard (D.M.A. 1983) – classical composer
 Barry Kernfeld (M.A. 1978, PhD 1981) – musicologist, jazz saxophonist, known for the largest jazz dictionary ever published, The New Grove Dictionary of Jazz Alex Kresovich (B.S. 2008) – music producer and songwriter
 Huey Lewis (undergrad 1967–69, dropped out) – rock musician, Huey Lewis and the News
 Robert Moog (PhD 1965) – inventor of the Moog synthesizer and founder of Moog Music
 Charles Previn (B.A. 1910) – Academy Award-winning film composer, seven-time Academy Award nominee
 Steve Reich (B.A. 1957) – Pulitzer Prize-winning composer, and one of the pioneers of minimal music; recipient of the BBVA Foundation Frontiers of Knowledge Award (2013)
 Christopher Rouse (D.M.A. 1977) – classical composer; winner of the Pulitzer Prize for Music
 Cary Sherman (1968) – chairman and CEO of the Recording Industry Association of America
 Tim Sommers (B.S. 2010) – Grammy-nominated producer/songwriter and member of the duo Kinetics & One Love
 Oliver Strunk (attended from 1917 to 1919 and in 1927) – musicologist who was on the faculty of Princeton University from 1937 to 1966; founding member and president (1959–1960) of the American Musicological Society
 Steven Stucky (D.M.A. 1978; Professor of Music Composition) – Pulitzer Prize-winning composer
 Gil Trythall (D.M.A. 1960) – composer and pianist
 Paul Francis Webster (undergrad 1927–1928, transferred) – Academy and Grammy Award-winning lyricist
 Peter Yarrow (B.A. 1959) – folk singer, member of Peter, Paul and Mary
 Andy Zax (B.A. 1986) twice-Grammy–nominated producer and music historian, known for his complete audio restoration of the Woodstock Festival.

Architecture and design
 Frederick L. Ackerman (BArch 1901) – architect and urban planner
 Raymond F. Almirall (1891) – architect of the Beaux-Arts period, practicing in New York City
 Edmund Bacon (BArch 1932) – urban planner, reshaped Philadelphia, 1949–1970
 Pietro Belluschi (Civil engineering grad) – architect, leader of the Modern Movement in architecture who was responsible for the design of over 1,000 buildings; dean of the architecture and planning school at the Massachusetts Institute of Technology (1951–1965); Fellow of the American Academy of Arts and Sciences and the American Institute of Architects; member of the National Academy of Design; recipient of AIA Gold Medal (1972), National Medal of Arts (1991)
 Morris Fuller Benton (engineering, 1896) – engineer and typeface designer
 Albert Cassell (BArch 1919) – designed buildings for Howard University, Morgan State University, and Virginia Union University
Vishaan Chakrabarti (B.S. Operations Research & Industrial Engineering and B.A. History of Art 1988)— architect and dean of UC Berkeley's College of Environmental Design 
 Gilmore David Clarke (B.S. 1913 landscape architecture and civil engineering) – designed the Central Park Zoo and the Unisphere
 Peter Eisenman (BArch 1955) – a foremost practitioner of deconstructivism in American architecture; Wolf Prize in Arts (2010)
 Frederick Earl Emmons (1907–1999) – architect
 Earl Flansburgh (BArch 1954, Trustee) — Cambridge, MA-based architect and designer of the Cornell Campus Store
Kathryn Gleason (BS Landscape architecture, 1979) — Cornell University landscape architect and archaeologist
 Edward Brodhead Green (1878) Buffalo-based architect
 Lawrence Halprin (B.A.) – landscape architect, designer and teacher; recipient of National Medal of Arts (2002)
 Margaret Hicks (BArch 1880) – first female architectural school graduate at Cornell
 Douglas Honnold (1901–1974) – Canadian-born American architect
 Emmett J. Hull (1906) – architect from Jackson, Mississippi
 William B. Ittner (1887) - St. Louis-based architect and designer of school buildings
 Lee S. Jablin (BArch 1971) – founding partner of Harman Jablin Architects
 Robert Trent Jones (1931) – designer of about 500 golf courses
 Henri Jova (1949) – noted Atlanta architect, key figure in redevelopment of Midtown Atlanta
 Raymond M. Kennedy (BArch 1915, MArch 1916) – designed Grauman's Chinese Theatre
 Rem Koolhaas (MArch) – Dutch architect, journalist, and screenwriter, Pritzker Architecture Prize winner
 David Macpherson (civil engineering) – city planner for San Antonio, Texas; designed the Santa Fe Railroad
 Khaled Malas (MArch) – architect and art historian 
 Tomás Mapúa (BArch 1911) – founded the Mapúa Institute of Technology; first Filipino to earn a degree in architecture
 Peter Marino (1971) – designer of boutique stores for luxury brands, and private residences for wealthy individuals
 Richard Meier (BArch 1957, professor) – Pritzker Architecture Prize, AIA Gold Medal winner
 William Henry Miller (BArch 1872) – designed many iconic buildings on Cornell's Ithaca campus
 Enrique Norten (MArch 1980) – Mexican architect, professor, 2003 World Trade Center Site Memorial Competition jury member
 Nathaniel A. Owings (BArch 1927) – founding partner of Skidmore, Owings and Merrill which popularized the International style after World War II
 Lawrence Perkins (BArch 1930) and Philip Will Jr. (BArch 1928) – founding partners of Perkins and Will, designers of seven buildings on the Engineering Quad
 Emmanuel Pratt (BArch 1999) – MacArthur Fellow (2019)
 Frederick Roehrig (1883 architecture) – early 20th-century architect known for his many landmark buildings in Pasadena, California, including the Hotel Green
 Richmond Shreve (BArch) – partner of architectural firm Shreve, Lamb and Harmon, which designed the Empire State Building
 Charles Morse Stotz (BArch 1921, master's degree) – architect, historian, and preservationist of Western Pennsylvania
 Vertner Tandy (MArch) – architect whose most famous commission was probably Villa Lewaro, the mansion of Harlem millionairess Madam C.J. Walker; co-founder of Alpha Phi Alpha Fraternity
 Olive Frances Tjaden (BArch 1925) pioneering woman architect; donor and namesake of Tjaden Hall
 Jan V. White (BArch 1951) – communication designer, educator and writer
 E. Stewart Williams (BArch 1932) – Palm Springs, California-based architect with a distinctive modernist style
 Helen Binkerd Young (BArch 1900) – architect and lecturer
 Ricardo Zurita (BArch 1984) – architect and designer of urban public projects

Fine arts and photography

 Elfriede Abbe (1940) – sculptor
 Richard Artschwager (1948) – sculptor, painter
 Margaret Bourke-White (B.A. 1927) – photojournalist
 Joan Danziger (B.F.A) – sculptor
 James De La Vega (B.F.A. 1994) – muralist, street artist in Harlem, New York 
 Arthur Dove (1903) – first abstract expressionist painter in the US
 George William Goddard (1917-1918, U.S. Army cadet) - United States Air Force brigadier general and a pioneer in aerial photography; studied aerial photography at United States Army School of Military Aeronautics at Cornell University
 Louise Lawler (B.F.A. 1969) – artist and photographer; member of the American Academy of Arts and Sciences (2019)
 Pat Lipsky (B.F.A. 1963) – painter
 Cabot Lyford (B.F.A. 1950) – sculptor
 Jill Magid (B.F.A. 1995) – performance artist
 Enrique Martinez Celaya (B.S. applied & engineering physics, 1986) – artist
 Amanda Means (B.A. 1969)– artist, photographer
 John Rosenbaum (M.E.P. 1957) – kinetic artist, educator
 Susan Rothenberg (B.F.A. 1967) – painter
 Monir Shahroudy Farmanfarmaian (1948–1951) – contemporary Iranian artist 
 Frederick Sommer (M.A. 1927 landscape architecture) – photographer
 Beth Ames Swartz (BSc 1957) – artist
 Hugh Troy (B.A. 1922–1927, did not graduate) – artist, famous prankster
 Harold Wethey (B.A. 1923) – art historian

Media

Journalism

 Eric Alterman (B.A. 1982 history and government) – author and columnist
 Jim Axelrod (B.A. 1985 history) – national correspondent and reporter for CBS News
 Jane Brody (1962, Biochemistry) — NY Times health and nutrition journalist
 Rodney A. Brooks (B.S. 1975 – Personal Finance Editor, USA Today Marion Hamilton Carter (B.S. 1898) - educator, psychologist, journalist, author
 Julius Chambers (B.A. 1870) – author, editor, journalist, travel writer, and activist against psychiatric abuse
 C.J. Chivers (B.A. 1987) – foreign correspondent with The New York Times; winner of Pulitzer Prize for International Reporting as part of a team of New York Times reporters and photographers (2009) and winner of Pulitzer Prize for Feature Writing (2017)
 Charles Collingwood (B.A. 1939) – broadcast journalist and foreign correspondent
 Ann Coulter (B.A. 1984 history) – book author and columnist
 S.E. Cupp (B.A. 2000 art history) – co-host of MSNBC's The Cycle Michael Dirda (M.A. 1974, PhD 1977, comparative literature) – Pulitzer Prize-winning book critic for The Washington Post Edward Jay Epstein (B.A., M.A.) – investigative journalist; former political science professor at Harvard, UCLA, and MIT
 Jessica Ettinger (B.S. 1997) – news anchor with CBS 1010 WINS New York; anchor of Today Show Radio, SiriusXM/NBC
 Michael Fremer (B.S. 1968 Industrial and Labor Relations) - audiophile journalist
 Vijaya Gadde (BS in Industrial and Labor Relations) – general counsel of Twitter 
 Jeffrey Gettleman (B.A. 1994) – foreign correspondent, The New York Times; Pulitzer Prize for International Reporting (2012)
 Wendy M. Grossman (B.A. 1975) – journalist, blogger
 Philip Gourevitch (B.A. 1986) – former editor of The Paris Review; 1998 National Book Critics Circle Award winner
 Carolyn Gusoff (B.A. 1984) – reporter and anchor with WNBC in New York City
 Sally Jacobsen (M.A. Economics) – journalist and foreign correspondent; first woman to serve as international editor of the Associated Press Neeraj Khemlani (1992) – co-president of CBS News
 Andy Kessler (B.S. 1980) – "Inside View" columnist, Wall Street Journal opinion page; author
 Aditi Kinkhabwala (B.A. American Studies) – sports reporter for NFL Network
 Austin H. Kiplinger (B.A. 1939) – journalist; editor of The Kiplinger Letter; founder of Kiplinger's Personal Finance magazine; winner of the Peabody Award
 John S. Knight – major newspaper publisher and editor, Pulitzer Prize winner
 Steven Lagerfeld (B.A. 1977) – editor of The Wilson Quarterly Carl Leubsdorf (B.A. 1959 government) – journalist and columnist
 Eric Lichtblau (B.A. 1987 English and political science) – Pulitzer Prize-winning journalist for national reporting with The New York Times Stuart Loory (B.A. 1954) – executive and reporter, CNN
 Roger Lowenstein (B.A. 1973) – financial journalist and author of When Genius Failed (2000)
 Farhad Manjoo (2000) – journalist and author, columnist for The Wall Street Journal, The New York Times James C. McKinley, Jr. (B.A. 1984) – foreign correspondent, The New York Times Anne Morrissy Merick (1955) – Journalist who broke barriers against women
 Philip Merrill (B.A. 1955 government, trustee) – owner and publisher of The Capital Daily Newspaper in Annapolis, MD and Washingtonian magazine; international statesman; adviser to U.S. presidents  
 Jeremy O'Grady (MA Political Science) – founding editor of The Week news digest magazine, and one of its original owners; now its editor-in-chief
 Keith Olbermann (B.S. 1979 communication) – sportscaster, news anchor and political commentator; hosted Countdown with Keith Olbermann on MSNBC
 Bill Pidto (1987) – a host of NHL Live on NHL Network and former anchor at ESPN, 1993–2008
 Jon Ralston (B.A. 1981) - journalist, founder of The Nevada Independent John Andrew Rea (B.A. 1869) – editor of The Olympian, Minneapolis Tribune, Bismarck Tribune and the Dakota edition of the St. Paul Pioneer Press Dave Ross – talk show host on KIRO-FM
 Dick Schaap (B.S. 1955) – sports newscaster on ABC and ESPN, two Emmy Awards, author and co-author of 33 books
 Jeremy Schaap (1991) – author, sports journalist, recipient of eight Emmy Awards
 Kate Snow (B.S. 1991 communication) – journalist, correspondent, NBC News
 Andrew Ross Sorkin (B.S. 1999 communication) – journalist, co-anchor of Squawk Box, author of Too Big to Fail Gerald Stone (1957 political science) – American-born Australian television and radio journalist, television executive, and author
 Howard Taubman (B.A. 1929) – Chief Music Critic and Chief Theater Critic for The New York Times in the 1950s and 1960s
 William T. Vollmann (B.A. 1981 comparative literature) – journalist, author of numerous books on war, including a seven volume treatise on violence
 Whit Watson (B.A., English, 1993) – announcer on Golf Channel, formerly at ESPN and Sun Sports; winner of four Emmy Awards; former Sports Director at WVBR
 Pete van Wieren – sportscaster and sport reporter, best known for 33-year career calling play-by-play for Major League Baseball's Atlanta Braves
 Sheryl WuDunn (B.A. 1981 European history) – journalist at The New York Times, co-winner in 1990 of the Pulitzer Prize for her coverage on the Tienanmen Square protests of 1989, winner of the George Polk Award in 1989, and winner of the Overseas Press Club in 1990
 Robert Zelnick (B.S.) – award-winning journalist; winner of two Emmy Awards and two Gavel Awards; formerly ABC News correspondent for more than 20 years, and professor of journalism at the Boston University College of Communication

Film, radio, television and theatre

 Robert Ahrens (B.A.) - film and theatre producer
 Ted Berkman (1933) – screenwriter, authored Bedtime for Bonzo Josh Bernstein (B.A. 1993 anthropology and psychology) – host of Digging for the Truth on the History Channel
 Prashant Bhargava  (B.A. 1994) Film Maker; Director Film "Sangam," "Patang - (Four Stars - Roger Ebert)" and "Radhe Radhe."
 Murray Burnett, co–wrote the play Everybody Comes to Rick's which was adapted into the film Casablanca Steve Carver (B.A.) – film director and producer
 Arun Chaudhary (B.A. 1997) – White House official videographer
 Dane Clark (bachelors 1930s) – actor, Moonrise Jordan Clarke (B.A. 1973 philosophy, M.F.A. 1973 acting) – actor, starred in Guiding Light, winner of a Daytime Emmy for Best Supporting Actor in a Drama Series
 Gordon Davidson (1956) – Drama Desk Award for Outstanding Director and Tony Award for Best Direction of a Play-winning stage and film director; fellow of the American Academy of Arts and Sciences
 Maria Dizzia (theater) – actress, nominated for the 2010 Tony Award for Best Performance by a Featured Actress in a Play for her performance in In the Next Room (or The Vibrator Play) Ellen Albertini Dow (B.A. 1935 theater, M.A. 1938 theater) – actress, Wedding Crashers and The Wedding Singer Dan Duryea (B.A. English) – actor
 Rick Elice (B.A.) – writer and former stage actor
 Zelda Fichandler – doyenne of regional theater 
 Art Fleming – original Jeopardy! host, 1964–75
 David Folkenflik (B.A. 1991 arts and sciences) – media correspondent for NPR
 Steven Franken (B.A. 1950) – actor, best known for his role in The Many Loves of Dobie Gillis Robert N. Fried (B.S., M.S.) – film producer, screenwriter, studio executive and media entrepreneur; Academy Award recipient in 1992 for his short film, Session Man David F. Friedman (1942, electrical engineering) – filmmaker
 Allen Funt (B.A. 1934 fine arts) – producer, created Candid Camera Carla Gallo (B.A. theater) – actress notable for recurring roles in the television series Undeclared, Carnivàle, Bones, Californication Eric Garcia (transferred 1992) – writer, author of Matchstick Men Joel Gertner (1993–1996, dropped out) – former ECW personality
 Sam Gold (B.A. English 2000) – theater director and actor; 2015 Tony Award for Best Direction of a Musical winner for Fun Home Meta Golding (theatre arts and international relations) – Haitian-American actress
 Harold Gould (M.A. 1948 theater, PhD 1953 dramatic speech and literature; professor of speech and drama) – stage, screen, and television actor
 Paul Eliot Green – playwright, known for Pulitzer Prize for Drama for his play, In Abraham's Bosom (1927)
 Kovid Gupta (M.B.A. 2015) – screenwriter, author, Kingdom of The Soap Queen: The Story of Balaji Telefilms Brian Hallisay (degree in economics and history) – actor from the television show Privileged Howard Hawks (mechanical engineering) – film director, producer and writer of the classic Hollywood era; directed Scarface, His Girl Friday, The Big Sleep, and Gentlemen Prefer Blondes Hugh Herbert – actor, playwright and comedian
 Catherine Hicks (M.F.A. 1976?) – actress; played Annie Camden on 7th Heaven John Hostetter (M.A. acting) – actor, played John the stage manager on Murphy Brown for 62 episodes
 Ricky Jay (Hotel) – magician, historian, actor, writer and scholar
 Frederick Johnson (B.A. 1978 English) – Emmy and WGA Award-winning television writer; credits include All My Children, The Young and the Restless, Days of Our Lives, As The World Turns, One Life to Live, Guiding Light Sidney Kingsley (B.A. 1928) – playwright, screenwriter, winner of the Pulitzer Prize in 1934 for the drama Men in White Mia Korf – actress, best known for originating the role of Blair Daimler Buchanan on One Life to Live
 Jamie Kovac (B.S. 2001, MEng 2002) – "Fury" on American Gladiators Ellie Krieger (B.S. 1988) – nutritionist, chef, and TV food celebrity
 Arthur Laurents (B.A. 1937 English) – playwright, screenwriter, director, author, credits include West Side Story, Rope, and Gypsy Leonard "Lenny" Lipton – author, filmmaker and stereoscopic vision system inventor; founder of StereoGraphics
 Jane Lynch (M.F.A. 1984 theater) – actress, best known for Glee Bill Maher (B.A. 1978 English) – comedian and satirist, best known for hosting the television series Politically Incorrect and Real Time with Bill Maher Rob Marciano – journalist and meteorologist
 Ed Marinaro – film and television actor.
 Louis Massiah (B.A. Astrophysics) – documentary filmmaker; MacArthur Fellow (1996), Tribeca Film Institute Fellow (1990, 1996), Fleisher Founder's Award (2009)
 Gardner McKay (attended for 2 years) – actor, artist, and author known for the lead role in the 1960s TV series Adventures in Paradise Carol Mendelsohn (B.A. 1973) – television producer; credits include C.S.I. Adolphe Menjou (B.S. engineering) – actor, known for his roles in The Sheik, The Three Musketeers, and Paths of GloryJustin H. Min (B.A. 2011 Government and English) - actor; currently stars as Ben Hargreeves in The Umbrella Academy
 Ronald D. Moore (failed out 1985) – writer and producer of Star Trek: The Next Generation, Star Trek: Deep Space Nine, and the re-imagined Battlestar Galactica; two–time Hugo Award winner, nominated for an Emmy Award
 Frank Morgan (undergrad 1908–09, dropped out) – actor, played the Wizard in The Wizard of Oz, two-time Academy Award nominee
 Bill Nye (B.S. 1977 mechanical engineering, MEng 1977, Frank H.T. Rhodes Class of '56 University Professor 2001–06) – star of Bill Nye the Science Guy; science education advocate
 Adepero Oduye (1999) – actress in 12 Years a Slave and Pariah Keith Olbermann (B.S. 1979 communication arts) – sports commentator, MSNBC news anchor, co-host of Football Night in America of NBC
 Peter Ostrum (D.V.M. 1984) – played Charlie Bucket in Willy Wonka & the Chocolate Factory Evan Parke (1990) – Jamaican-born American actor best known for his role as Hayes in King Kong Ethan Phillips (MFA) – actor and playwright
 Richard Price (B.S. 1971) – author, The Wanderers and six other novels; Academy Award-nominated screenwriter for The Color of Money and Clockers Keith Raywood (B.A. Architecture, 1980) – Emmy Award-winning production designer
 Christopher Reeve (B.A. 1974 theater arts and English) – actor, best known for starring in Superman and its sequels
 Jason Reich (B.S. Communication 1998) – Emmy Award-winning writer for The Daily Show with Jon Stewart Christopher Rich (M.A. Theater Arts) – played Miller Redfield on Murphy Brown Daniel K. Riskin (PhD) – Canadian evolutionary biologist and television personality, known for co-hosting the Canadian television series Daily Planet Casey Robinson – producer, director and screenwriter
 Elizabeth Allen Rosenbaum (B.A.) – director
 William Sadler (M.F.A. 1974) – actor, known for films including The Shawshank Redemption Gene Saks (B.A. 1943) – stage and film director, an inductee of the American Theater Hall of Fame; seven-time nominee and three-time winner of Tony Award; four-time nominee of Drama Desk Award
 Andrea Savage (B.A. Political Science and Spanish, minor in Law Studies) – Actress, Dog Bites Man Robert Frederic Schenkkan, Jr. (M.F.A 1977) – award-winning playwright, screenwriter, and actor; the Pulitzer Prize for Drama (1992) for his work The Kentucky Cycle, and the Tony Award for Best Play (2014) for his drama All the Way earned Bert Schneider – film and television producer, Academy Award for Best Documentary Feature for producing Hearts and Minds (1975)
 Vivian Schiller (B.A. Russian) – former CEO of NPR
 Thelma Schoonmaker (B.A. 1961) – film editor, received the Academy Award for Raging Bull, The Aviator, and The Departed David Seidler (1959) – screenwriter, won 83rd Academy Award for Best Original Screenplay for The Kings Speech (2010)
 Robert Smigel (undergrad 1978–80, transferred) – puppeteer behind Triumph the Insult Comic Dog; first head writer of Late Night with Conan O'Brien; author of "TV Funhouse" animations on Saturday Night Live Jimmy Smits (M.F.A. 1982) – actor
 Sarah Spain – ESPN sports journalist
 Tim Squyres (B.A. 1981) – Academy Award-nominated film editor, best known for Crouching Tiger, Hidden Dragon Yale Summers (Bachelor's Business with honors, 1955) – actor and governing member of the Screen Actors Guild
 Ken Sunshine (1970) – publicist
 Dominique Thorne (B.S. 2019) – American actress, known primarily as Riri Williams/Ironheart in the Marvel Cinematic Universe
 Jennifer Tipton (B.A. 1958) – award-winning theatre and dance lighting designer; MacArthur Fellowship (2008)
 Franchot Tone (B.A. 1927) – actor, nominated for the Academy Award for Best Actor for Mutiny on the Bounty Ming Tsai (hotel administration) – celebrity chef of Ming's Quest, a cooking show featured on the Fine Living Network, and Simply Ming on American Public Television
 Jerry Wasserman (PhD English Literature) – film and television actor; also professor and head of the Department of Theatre and Film at the University of British Columbia
 Andrew Weinberg (B.A. 1998) – television writer and co-winner of Primetime Emmy Award for Outstanding Writing for a Variety Series (2007)
 David Wild – writer and critic in the music and television industries, nominated for an Emmy Award for his work on America: A Tribute to Heroes Sheri Wilner – playwright
 Walt Witcover Theatre educator, né Walter Witcover Scheinman
 Mary Woronov (did not graduate) – actress, member of Andy Warhol's The Factory
 Paula Vogel (1976, M.A, 2016, PhD) – playwright, known for Pulitzer Prize for Drama for her play, How I Learned to Drive (1998)

Education
See: List of Cornell University alumni (education)

Athletics

American football
 Greg Bloedorn (1995) – former NFL offensive lineman and long snapper for the Seattle Seahawks
 Kevin Boothe (B.S. 2005 hotel administration) – former lineman for the Oakland Raiders and New York Giants 
 Al Dekdebrun – Buffalo Bisons, 1946, Chicago Rockets, 1947, Boston Yanks, 1948, New York Yankees, 1948
 Pete Gogolak (1964) – Buffalo Bills 1964–1965, New York Giants, 1966–1975; first "soccer style" kicker in professional "American" football
 Derrick Harmon (1984) – San Francisco 49ers 1984–1986
 Mort Landsberg (1919–1970) - NFL player
 Bill Lazor (1994) – NFL assistant coach
 Chad Levitt (1997) – Oakland Raiders, St. Louis Rams
 Ed Marinaro (B.S. 1972) – Minnesota Vikings, New York Jets, and Seattle Seahawks; runner-up for the 1971 Heisman Trophy Award, actor on Hill Street Blues Jeff Mathews (2014) – quarterback for the Hamilton Tiger-Cats
 Lou Molinet (1928) – Frankford Yellow Jackets, 1927 first Hispanic-American player in the National Football League
 Seth Payne (1997) – Jacksonville Jaguars, 1997–2001, Houston Texans, 2001–2007
 Lee Reherman (1988) – Miami Dolphins, actor on American Gladiators and X-Files Luke Tasker (2013) – wide receiver for the Hamilton Tiger-Cats
 J. C. Tretter (2012) – offensive guard for the Green Bay Packers (2013–2016) and Cleveland Browns (2017–present)
 Bryan Walters (2010) – wide receiver for the San Diego Chargers 2010–2011, Seattle Seahawks (2012–2014), Jacksonville Jaguars (2015–present)
 Glenn "Pop" Warner (LL.B. 1894, football coach) – football player and coach; founder of Pop Warner Little Scholars
 Gary Wood (1964) – New York Giants 1964–1966, 1968–1969, New Orleans Saints, 1967

Baseball
 Joe Birmingham – baseball player, Cleveland Naps, 1906–1914
 Jon Daniels (B.S. 1999) – general manager of the Texas Rangers, youngest GM ever in Major League Baseball
 Robert A. DuPuy (J.D. 1973) – former president and chief operating officer of Major League Baseball (MLB)
 Joseph Iglehart (1914) – chairman of the board, Baltimore Orioles, 1955–1965
 Hughie Jennings (LL.B. study 1901–1904, dropped out; Baseball Coach, 1899–?) – Baseball Hall of Fame-inducted shortstop; Louisville Colonels (1891–1893), Baltimore Orioles (1893–1899), Brooklyn Superbas (1899–1900, 1903), Philadelphia Phillies (1901–02), Detroit Tigers (1907, 1909, 1912, 1918)
 Rob Manfred (B.S. 1980) – chief operating officer of Major League Baseball; 10th Commissioner of Major League Baseball
 A. J. Preller (B.S. 1999) – general manager of the Major League Baseball's San Diego Padres 2014–
 Brandon Taubman (B.A. 2007), assistant general manager of the Houston Astros, 2018–2019
 Bill Walkenbach (B.A. 1998) – Cornell head baseball coach

Basketball
 Bryan Colangelo (B.S. 1987) – president and general manager of the Toronto Raptors, 2005, 2007 NBA Executive of the Year
 Jon Jaques – American-Israeli assistant men's basketball coach for Cornell University, who played for Ironi Ashkelon in Israel
 Nat Militzok (1923–2009) – New York Knicks basketball player
 Larry Weinberg – co-founder and president (1975–1988) of the NBA's Portland Trail Blazers

Ice hockey
 Gary Bettman (B.S. 1974) – Commissioner of the NHL (1993–)
 Byron Bitz (2007) – forward for the Boston Bruins 2008–2010, Florida Panthers 2010–2011, Vancouver Canucks 2011–2012
 Ken Dryden (B.A. 1969) – NHL Hockey Hall of Fame goaltender, six-time Stanley Cup winner, Conn Smythe Trophy winner, Calder Memorial Trophy winner, Canadian Member of Parliament
 Colin Greening (2010) – Centre for the Ottawa Senators 2011–2015, Toronto Maple Leafs 2016–2019
 Ned Harkness (lacrosse and hockey head coach) – Coach of Cornell NCAA hockey champions in 1967 and 1970; previously RPI coach of 1954 national champs; also head coach and then general manager of the Detroit Red Wings
 David LeNeveu – NHL goalie, previously for the Phoenix Coyotes
 Matt Moulson (2006) – left wing for the Buffalo Sabres, and previously New York Islanders and Minnesota Wild.
 Douglas Murray (2003) – defenseman for Montreal Canadiens and previously San Jose Sharks and Pittsburgh Penguins, 2010 Olympian
 Riley Nash (2007–2010) – centre for the Columbus Blue Jackets, formerly of the Boston Bruins and Carolina Hurricanes, 2011–present
 Lance Nethery – NHL player, executive in the German Elite League
 Joe Nieuwendyk (1988) – NHL player, three-time Stanley Cup champion, 2002 Olympic gold medalist
 Ryan O'Byrne (2007) – former NHL defenseman for the Montreal Canadiens and Colorado Avalanche
 Rick Olczyk (Law 1996) – Assistant general manager of the Carolina Hurricanes
 Joakim Ryan (2015) – NHL defenseman for the Los Angeles Kings and previously for the San Jose Sharks
 Ben Scrivens (2010) – former NHL goaltender for the Montreal Canadiens, Toronto Maple Leafs, Los Angeles Kings and Edmonton Oilers
 Ryan Vesce (2004) – right wing for the San Jose Sharks, 2008–2010

Lacrosse
 Michael "Mike" G. French (1976) – All-American lacrosse player at Cornell from 1974 to 1976, leading the "Big Red" to the NCAA Men's Lacrosse Championship in 1976
 Daniel R. Mackesey (1977) – received NCAA Top Five Award in 1978 for lacrosse and soccer; inducted in National Lacrosse Hall of Fame in 2006
 Eamon McEneaney (1977) – All-American lacrosse player at Cornell from 1975 to 1977, leading the "Big Red" to the NCAA Men's Lacrosse Championship in 1976 and 1977. Eamon died in the September 11 attacks on the World Trade Center
 Rob Pannell (2013) – professional lacrosse player for the New York Lizards; recipient of Lt. Raymond Enners Award (2013) and Tewaaraton Trophy (2013)
 Max Seibald (born 1987) – lacrosse player

Tennis
 William Larned – seven-time U.S. tennis championship winner 
 Dick Savitt (born 1927) – tennis player, ranked No. 2 in the world

Wrestling
 Kyle Dake (B.A. 2013) – Freestyle Wrestling Olympic Gold Medalist in 2020, World Champion (2018, 2019, 2021), World Cup Gold Medalist (2018), 4-time NCAA Division I individual national titleholder (2010–2013)
 Yianni Diakomihalis – Freestyle and Folkstyle Wrestling, 3-time NCAA Division I individual national titleholder (2018, 2019, 2021)
 Joe DeMeo – U.S. Olympic wrestling assistant coach

Olympics
 Jon Anderson (1971) – 1972 Olympian, track; winner of 1973 Boston Marathon
 Edward Tiffin Cook, Jr. (1910) – men's pole vault Olympic gold medalist in 1908 Summer Olympics 
 Darren Eliot (1983) – NHL player, Los Angeles Kings, Detroit Red Wings, Buffalo Sabres; 1984 Olympian
 Jamie Greubel (2006) – bronze medalist in two-woman bobsleigh at the 2014 Sochi games 
 Muhammad Halim (2008) – competed in the 2012 and 2016 Olympic games, triple jump
 Al Hall (1956) – four-time Olympian (1956, 1960, 1964, 1968), hammer throw
 Rebecca Johnston (2012) – hockey player, 2010 and 2014 Olympic gold medalist with Team Canada
 Robert J. Kane (1934, director of athletics) – U.S. Olympic Committee president, 1976–1980; inducted into U.S. Olympic Hall of Fame, 1986
 Kent Manderville (1993) – NHL player, Calgary Flames, Pittsburgh Penguins; 1992 Olympic silver medalist with Team Canada
 Edith Master (born 1932) – Olympic bronze medalist equestrian
 Travis Mayer (undergrad 2000–01, on leave) – Olympic freestyle skiing silver medalist
 Charles Moore (1951, director of Athletics, 1994–1999) – 1952 Olympic gold medalist (hurdles) and silver medalist (1600-meter relay); honored as Golden Olympian, 1996
 Pablo Morales (J.D. 1994) – three-time Olympic gold medalist in swimming, 1984 and 1992
 David Munson (1906) – four-mile team Olympic gold medalist in 1904 Summer Olympics; inducted into the Cornell University Athletic Hall of Fame in 1988
 Richard Pew (1956) – 1956 Summer Olympics, épée fencing
 Harry Porter (1905) – 1908 Summer Olympics high jump gold medalist
 Alma Richards (1917) – 1912 Summer Olympics high jump gold medalist
 Bo Roberson (1958) – the only person to earn an Ivy League degree, an Olympic medal, a doctorate, and have a career in the NFL
 Jamie Silverstein (undergrad 2002–2004, 2006–) – Olympic figure skater
Donald Spero, Olympic rower, world champion, and venture capitalist

Other
 Bruce Arena (B.S. 1971) – five-time NCAA Soccer Championship coach at the University of Virginia; coach of Major League Soccer's D.C. United; coach of U.S. national team; coach of MLS's New York Red Bulls; present coach of MLS's Los Angeles Galaxy
 Olivier Busquet – professional poker player
 Clarence C. Combs Jr. — polo player, two-time winner of the Monty Waterbury Cup
 Brian Hastings – professional poker player
 Bill Jenkins – NHRA drag car racer
 Alexander Kevitz (1923) – chess master
 Teddy Mayer (J.D.) – motor racing team manager
Saurabh Netravalkar – cricketer
 John Nickles (1986) – triathlete; winner of the World Champion Title in the 1999 Hawaii Ultraman World Championship; Ultra Marathon Cycling Association world record holder in 1994
 Peter Revson – race car driver
 Dave Sarachan – head coach of Major League Soccer's Chicago Fire (2002–2007)
 Doug J. Smylie (attended and played football for Cornell) – Canadian football player (1945–1953), for the Toronto Argonauts, Montreal Alouettes and Ottawa Rough Riders
 Donald Spero — rower
 Carl F. Ullrich (B.S. 1950) – Athletic Director at West Point, 1980–1990; executive director of the Patriot League, 1989–1993
 Dan Wood (PhD 1977) — five-year Cornell golf and soccer coach (1970s); coached the Tacoma Tides, Colorado Caribous and Atlanta Chiefs; turned professional golfer in 1980

Crime
 Nick Berg (undergrad 1996–98, transferred) – businessman beheaded by Islamic militants on May 7, 2004, during the U.S.-led occupation of Iraq
 Leo Frank (B.S. 1906 engineering) – factory manager; lynched in 1915 for the alleged murder of a 13-year-old girl; later believed to be innocent; subject of the musical Parade David G. Friehling (B.S. 1981) – accountant to Ponzi schemer Bernard Madoff
 Mark Gerard (D.V.M., 1962) – perpetrated horse racing fraud, switching horses' identities
 Katrina Leung (B.S. 1976) – accused spy; case dismissed; later sentenced to terms of plea agreement
 Robert Tappan Morris (graduate study 1988–89, suspended) – author of the Morris Worm, which crippled the Internet in 1988
 Michael Ross (B.S. 1981 agricultural economics) – convicted serial killer executed in Connecticut on May 13, 2005
 Michael Schwerner (B.A. 1961 sociology) – victim in the murders of Chaney, Goodman, and Schwerner by the Ku Klux Klan in 1964
 Mark Whitacre (PhD 1983 nutritional biochemistry) – highest-ranked executive in U.S. history of a Fortune 500 company to turn whistleblower and FBI informant; pleaded guilty to fraud

Other
 Henry Arthur Callis – physician and professor of Medicine at Howard University; one of seven founders of Alpha Phi Alpha fraternity, served as its general president in 1915
 Lisa Daugaard (M.A. 1987) – MacArthur Fellow (2019); criminal justice reformer
 Gregory K. Dreicer (PhD in Science and Technology Studies) –  curatorial strategist, historian of technology, experience designer, exhibition developer, curator, and museum manager
 Erwin Engst (1941 agro-pastoral studies) – advisor to the People's Republic of China
 Eric Erickson (1921 engineering) – Swedish oil executive; worked for American intelligence during World War II; book and film The Counterfeit Traitor are based on him
 Zvi Galil – president of Tel Aviv University
 Jon Gordon (B.A.) –author of The Energy Bus''
 Joanna Guy (B.A. 2013) – Miss Maryland 2012
 Rutherford P. Hayes (B.S. 1880) – vice-president and acting president of the American Library Association; third son of US President Rutherford B. Hayes 
 William H. Hinton (1941 agronomy and dairy husbandry) – farmer; writer
 Genevieve Hughes (B.A. 1954) – one of the 13 original Freedom Riders
 Zach Iscol (Government 2001) – entrepreneur, US Marine, and candidate in the 2021 New York City Comptroller election
 Imogene Powers Johnson (B.S. 1952) – billionaire; philanthropist
 Carol Levine (B.A. 1956) – AIDS policy specialist; MacArthur Fellow (1993)
 Ross Gilmore Marvin (B.A. 1905) – Arctic explorer with Robert Peary; died during the 1908–1909 expedition
 Stephanie Rader (B.A. 1937) – undercover intelligence agent; recipient of the Legion of Merit (2016)
 Jason Rohrer (B.S. 2000, M.E. 2001) – video game designer
 Erik M. Ross (B.A. 1988) – U.S. Navy admiral
 Adam Segal – cybersecurity expert; director at the Digital and Cyberspace Policy Program of the Council on Foreign Relations
 David Williston (B.A. 1898) – first professionally trained African American landscape architect in the United States.
 Alfreda Bosworth Withington – physician and author
 Evelyn Groesbeeck Mitchell (B.A. 1902) – physician and researcher

See also
 List of Cornell University faculty
 List of Quill and Dagger members
 Notable alumni of the Sphinx Head Society

Notes

References

External links
 Cornell in professional sports

Lists of people by university or college in New York (state)